= Douala =

Largest city and economic capital of Cameroon

- City
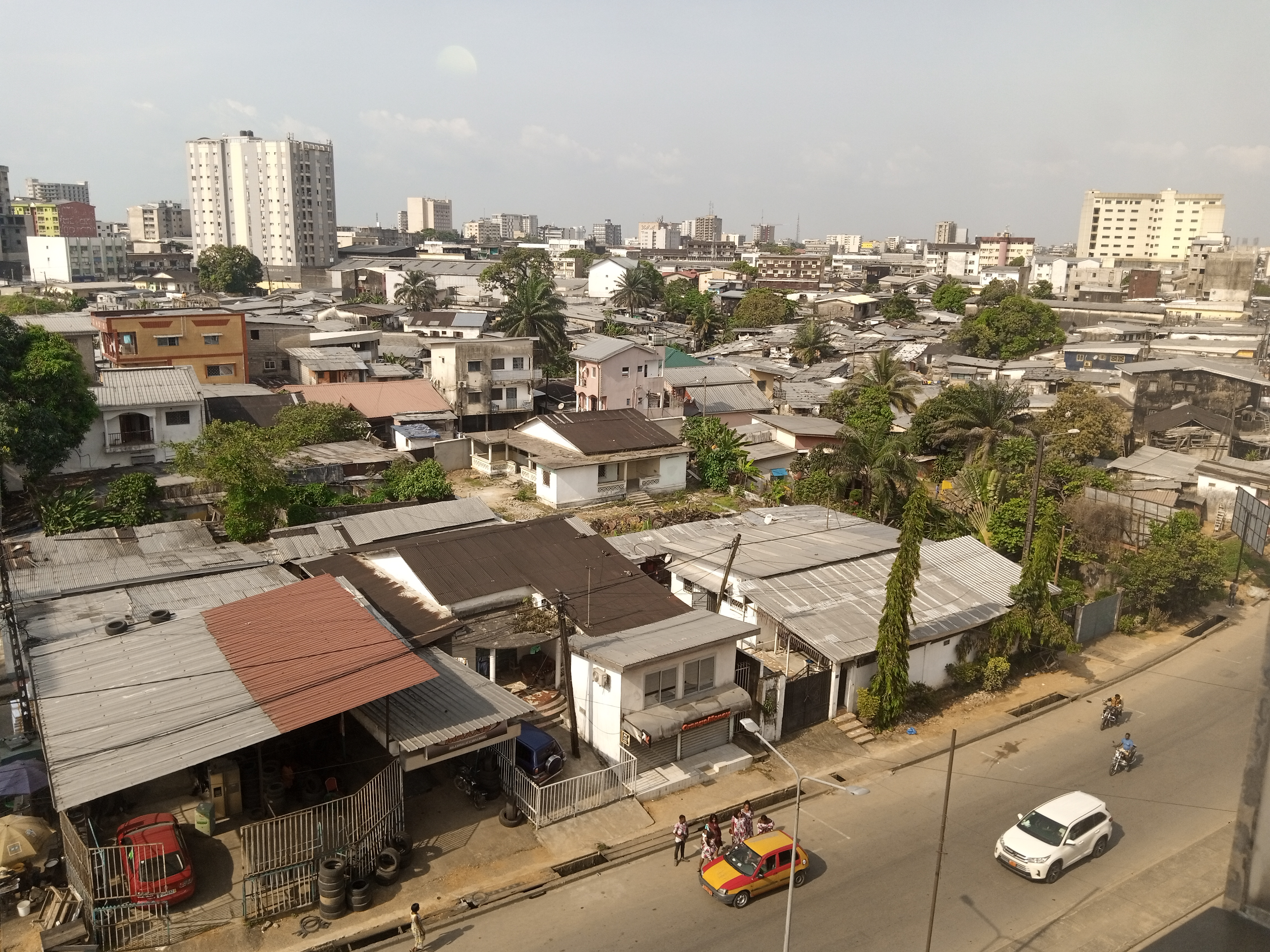
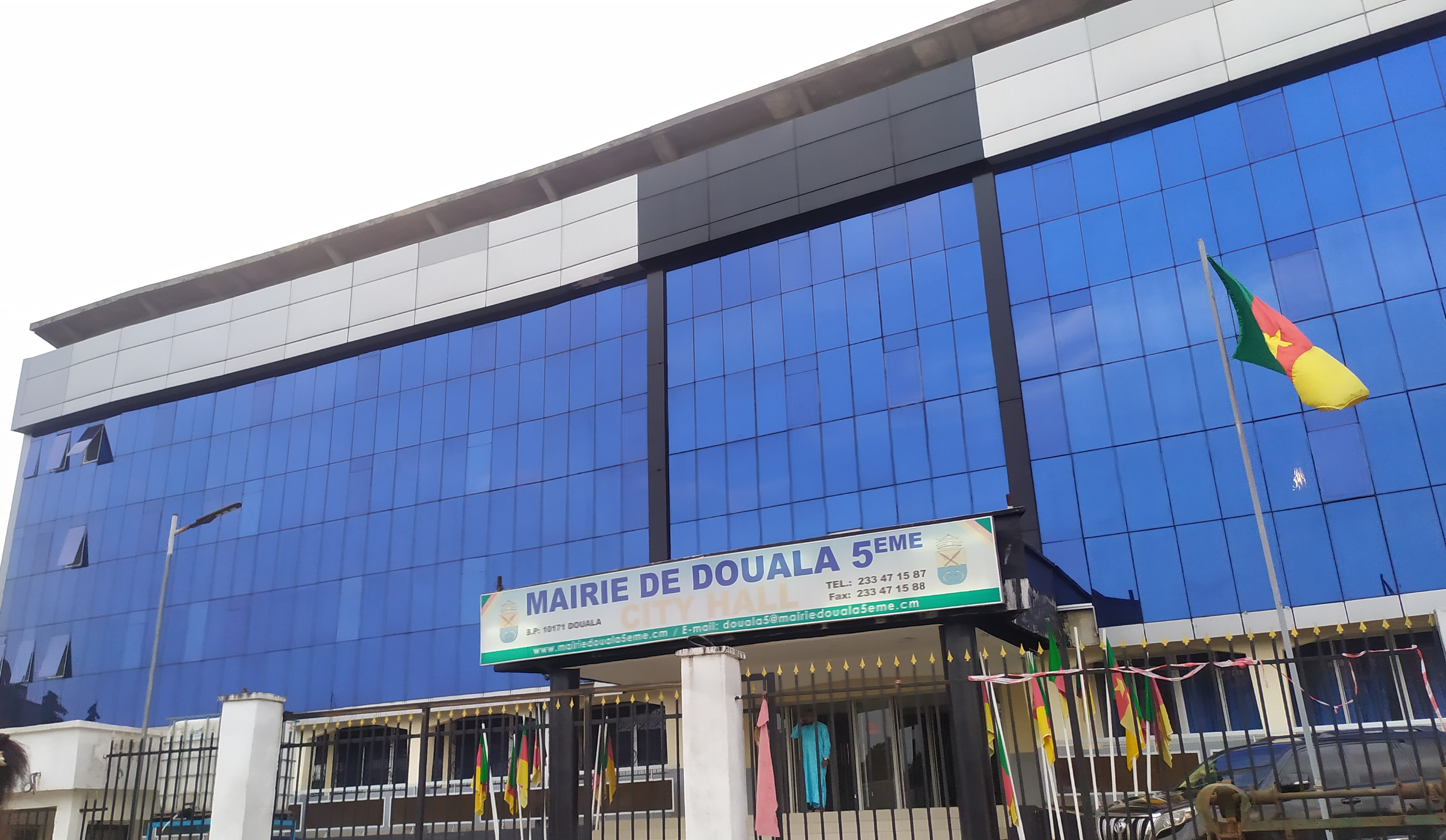
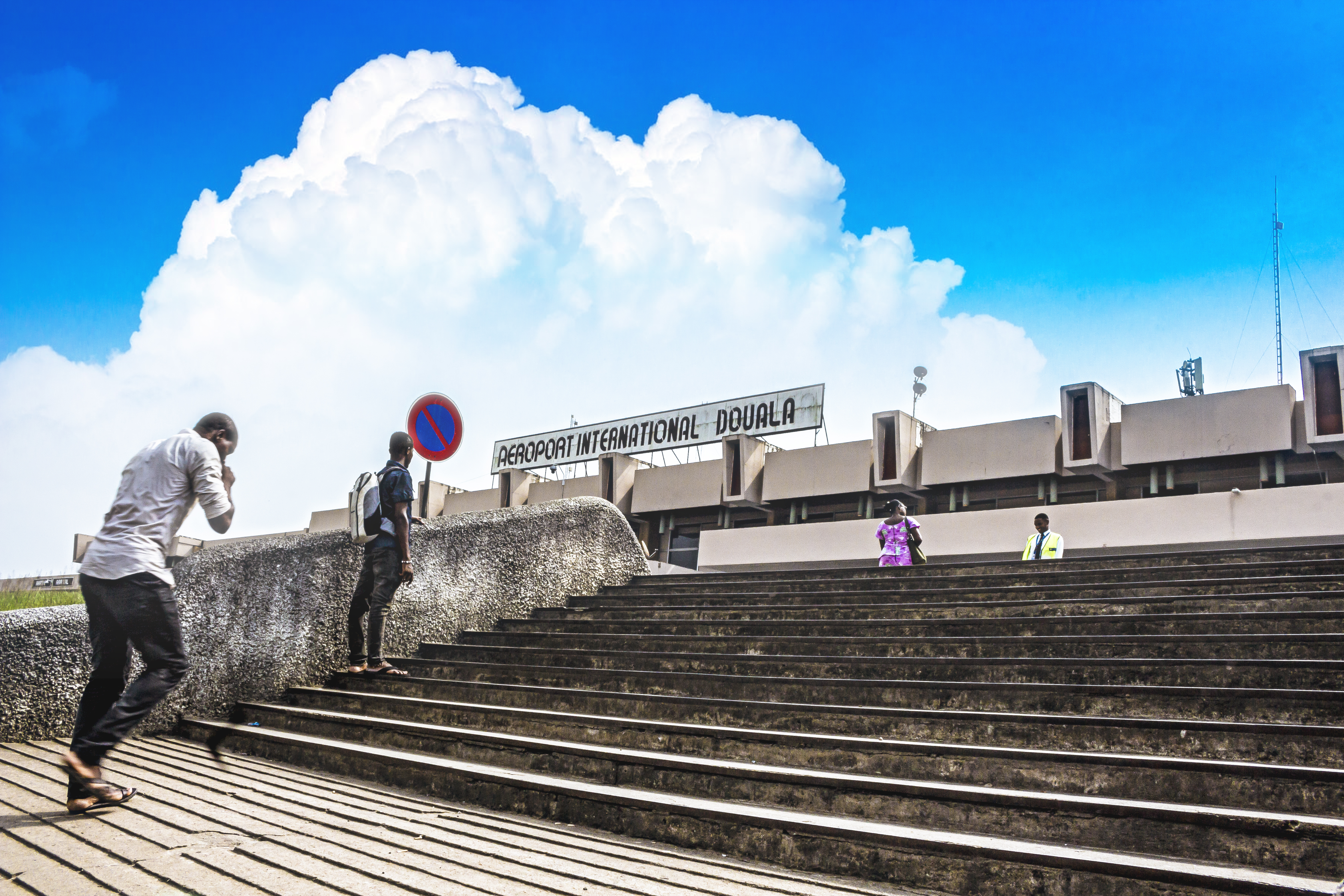
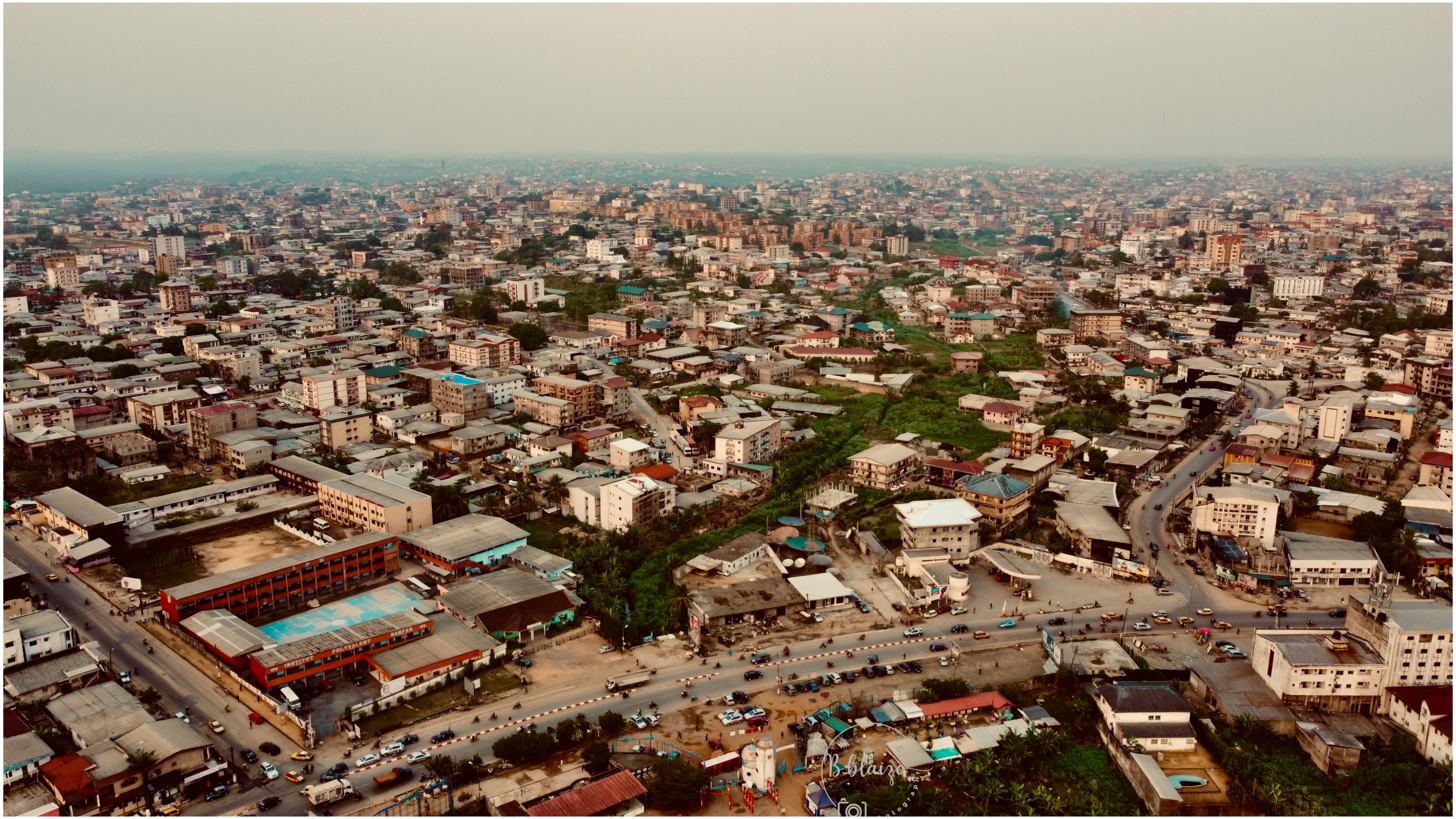
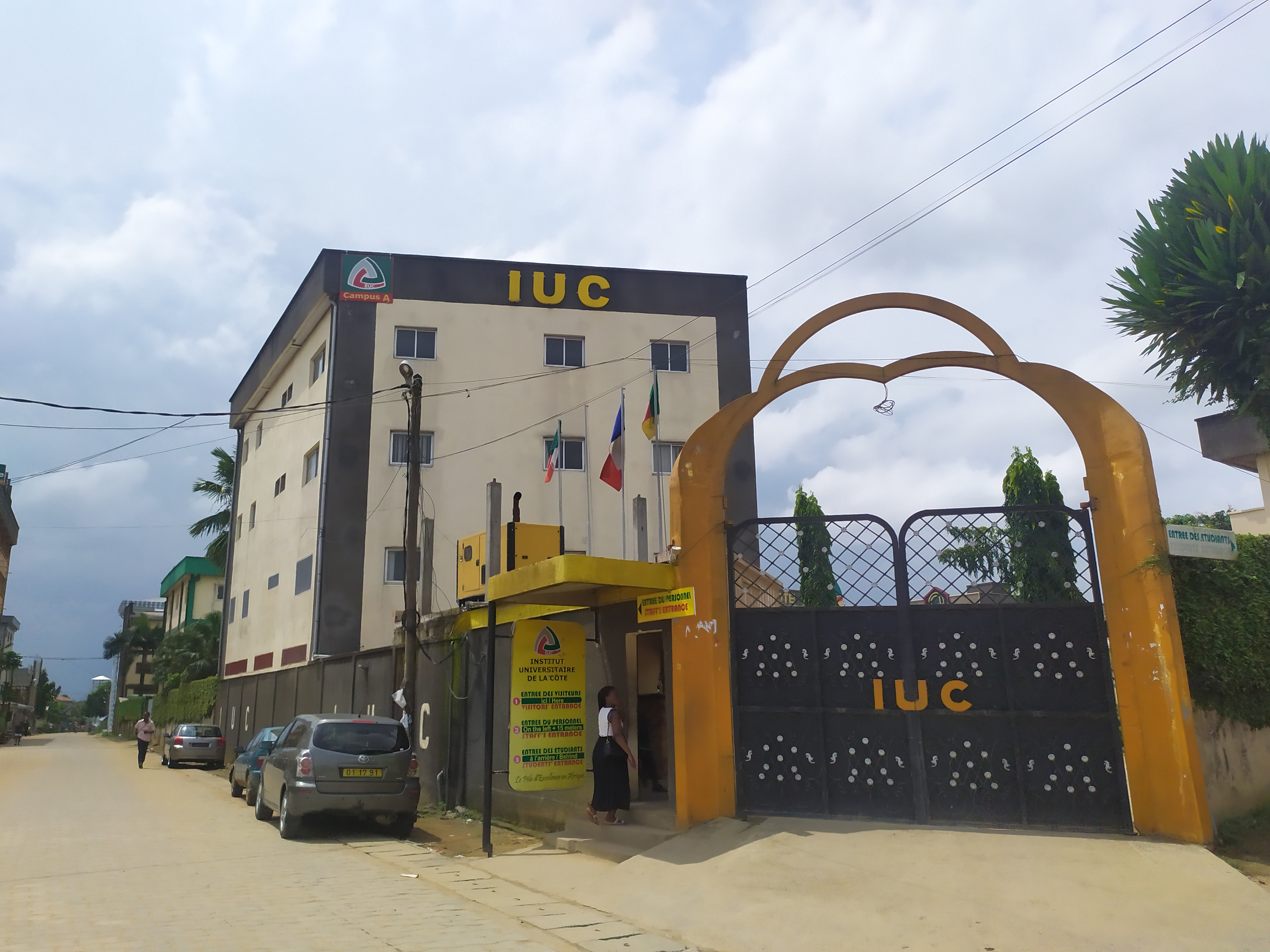
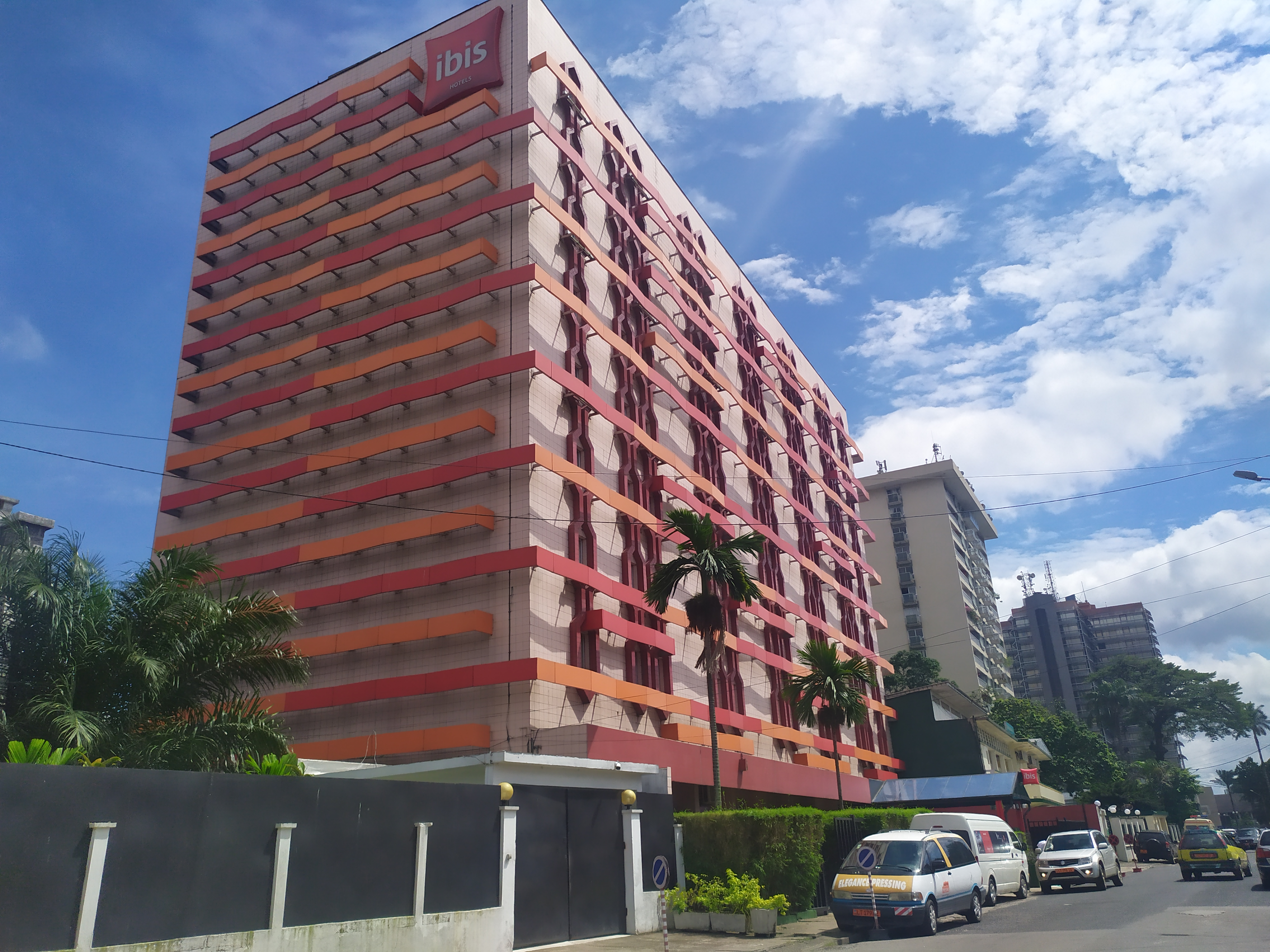
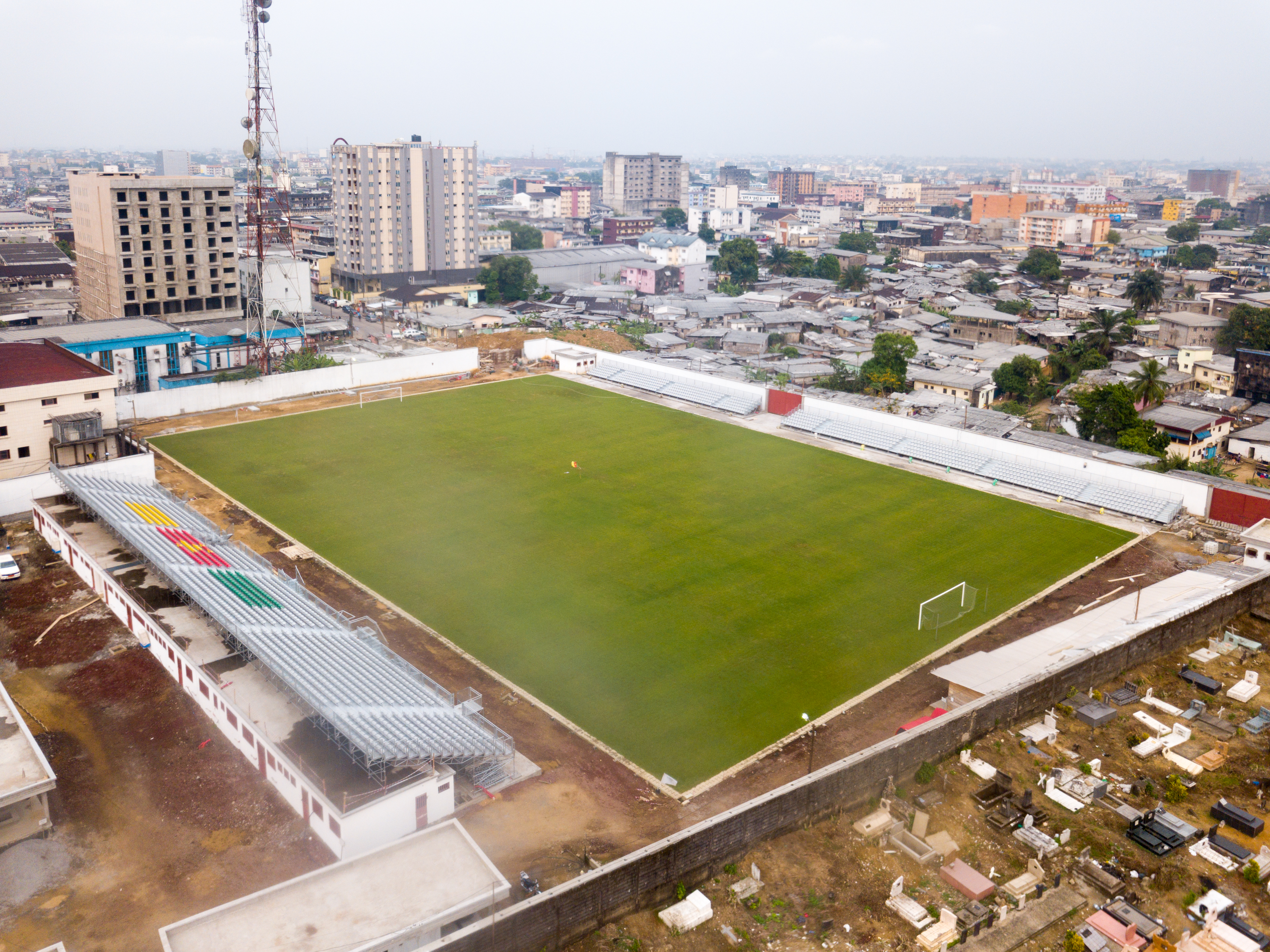
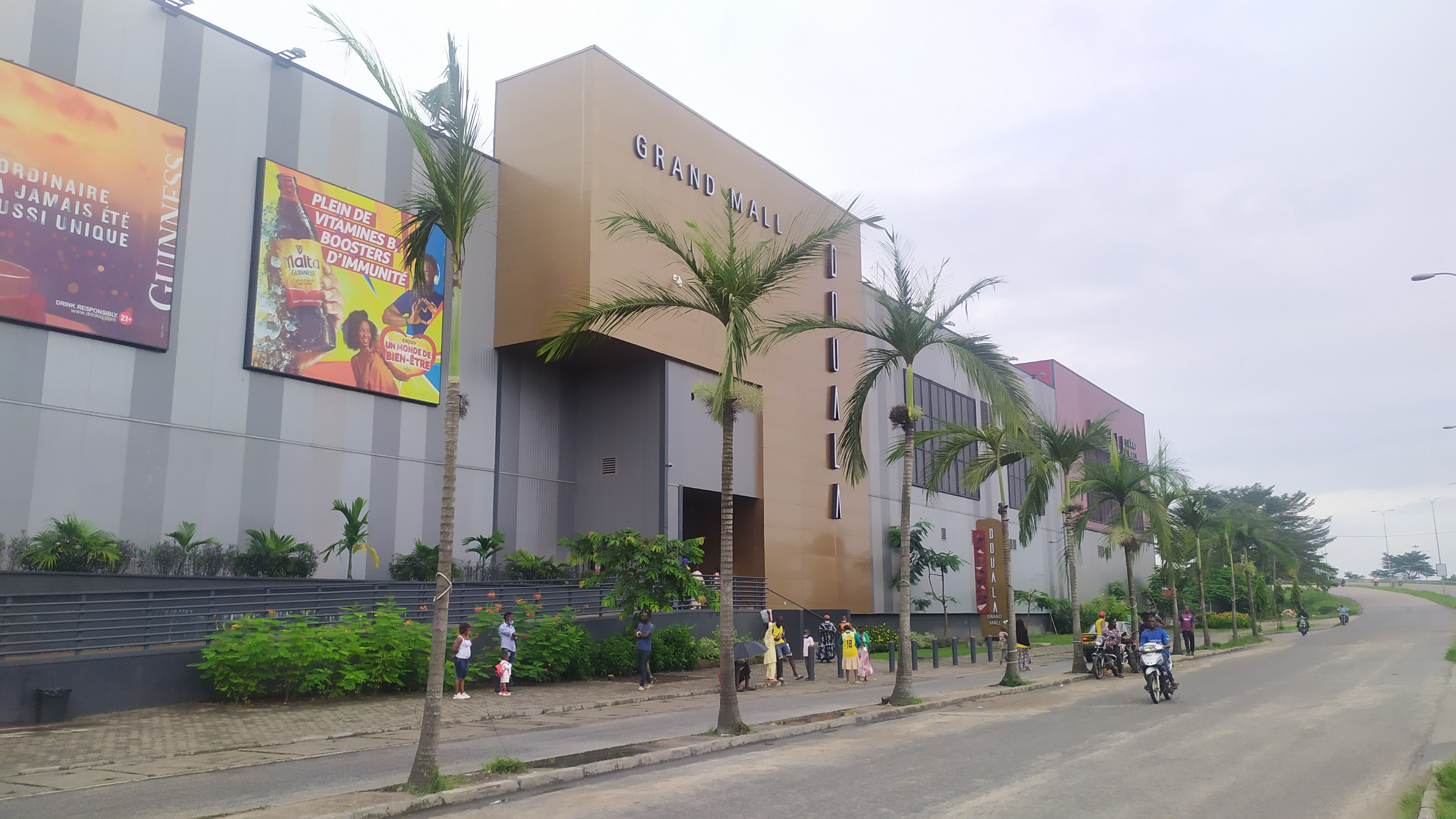
- Quarter Bali City Hall of Douala Douala International Airport Skyline of Douala Institut Universitaire de la Côte Hotel Ibis Douala Mbappé Léppé Stadium Grand Mall

- Location in Cameroon
- Coordinates: 4°03′03″N 9°46′04″E
- Country: Cameroon
- Region: Littoral
- Department: Wouri

Government

Area
  - City: 923 km^{2} (356 sq mi)
- Elevation: 13 m (43 ft)

Population (2025)
  - City: 3,816,500
  - Rank: 1st
  - Density: 4,130/km^{2} (10,700/sq mi)
  - Urban: 3,987,298
  - Metro: 4,346,000
- Demonym(s): Doualais (masc., French), Doualaise (fem., French)
- Time zone: UTC+01:00 (WAT)
- Climate: Am
- Website: www.douala-city.org

Douala is the largest city in Cameroon and its economic capital. It is also the capital of Cameroon's Littoral Region. It was home to Central Africa's largest port, now being replaced by Kribi port. It has the country's major international airport, Douala International Airport (DLA). It is the commercial and economic capital of Cameroon and the entire CEMAC region comprising Gabon, Congo, Chad, Equatorial Guinea, Central African Republic and Cameroon. Consequently, it handles most of the country's major exports, such as oil, cocoa and coffee, timber, metals and fruits. As of 2025, the city and its surrounding area had an estimated population of 4,346,000, while the city proper had an estimated population of 3,816,500. The city sits on the estuary of the Wouri River and its climate is tropical.

== History ==
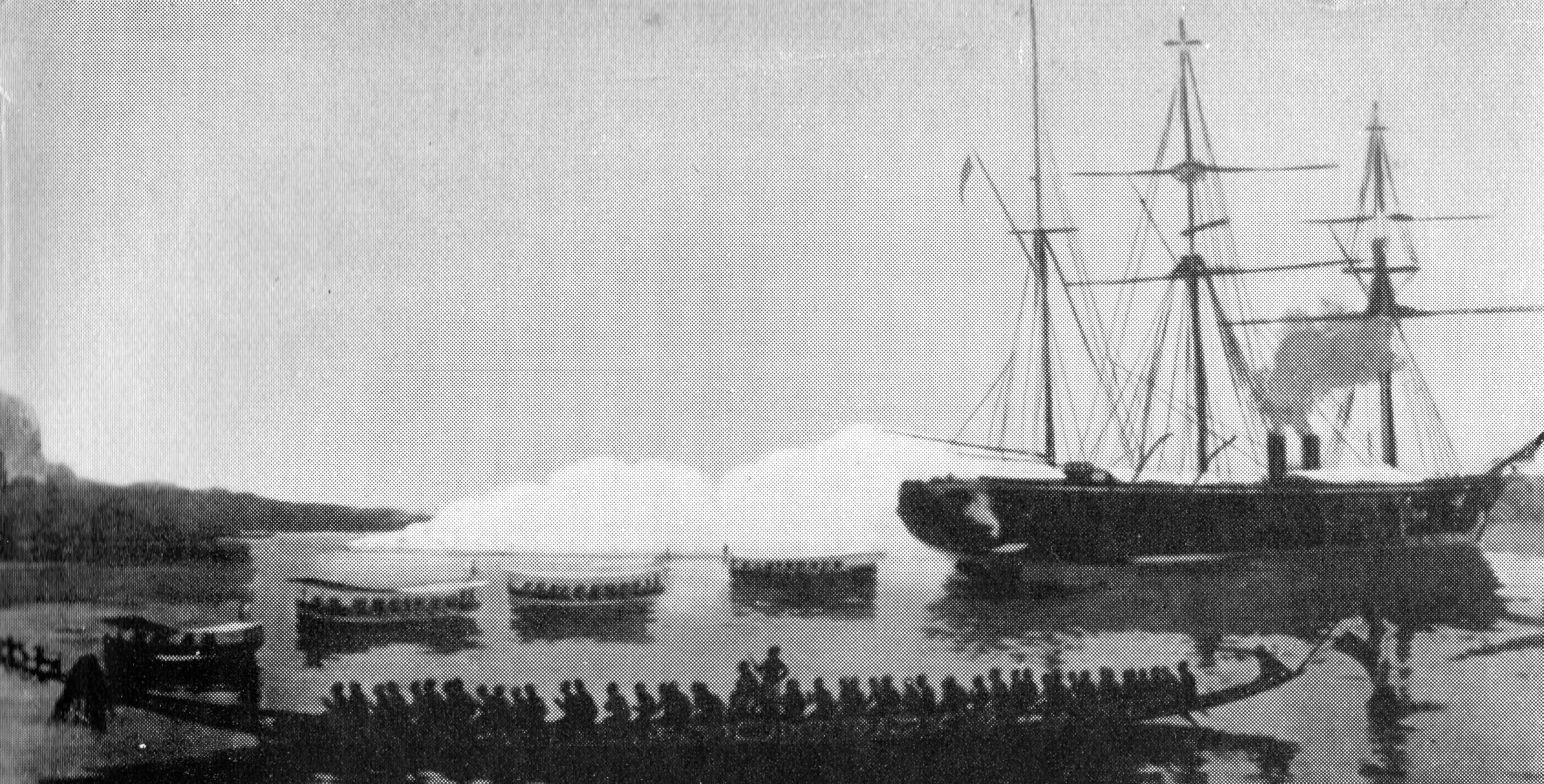
The German corvette SMS Olga at the bombardment of Hickorytown, Cameroon (today Douala) on December 21, 1884

The first Europeans to visit the area were the Portuguese in about 1472. At the time, the estuary of Wouri River was known as the Rio dos Camarões (Shrimp River). By 1650, it had become the site of a town formed by immigrants, said to have arrived from Congo, who spoke the Duala language. During the 18th century it was the center of the transatlantic slave trade.

In 1826 Douala appeared to be made of four different villages located in four specific locations: the village of Deido (Dido), of Akwa, of Njo and Hickory-town (today Bonaberi, located on the other side of Wouri River).

Between 1884 and 1895 the city was a German protectorate. The colonial politics focused on commerce and some exploration of the unoccupied territories. In 1885, Alfred Saker organized the first mission of the British Baptist Church. In the same year the city known as Kamerun was renamed Douala and became the capital of the territory until 1902, when the capital was moved to Buéa.

In 1907 the Ministry of Colonies was established and Douala had 23,000 citizens.

After World War I in 1919, the German colonial territories became French and British protectorates. France received a mandate to administer Douala. A treaty was signed with the local chiefs.

From 1940 to 1946, it was the capital of Cameroon. In 1955 the city had over 100,000 inhabitants.

In 1960, Cameroon gained independence as a federal republic, with its capital in Yaoundé. Douala became the major economic city. In 1972, the federal republic became a unitary state. Douala then had a population of around 500,000.

In the 1980s, in Cameroon the struggle for liberalization and multi-party democracy grew. Between May and December 1991, Douala was at the center of the civil disobedience campaign called the ghost town operation (ville morte) during which economic activities shut down to make the country ungovernable and to force the government to allow multi-partitism and freedom of expression.

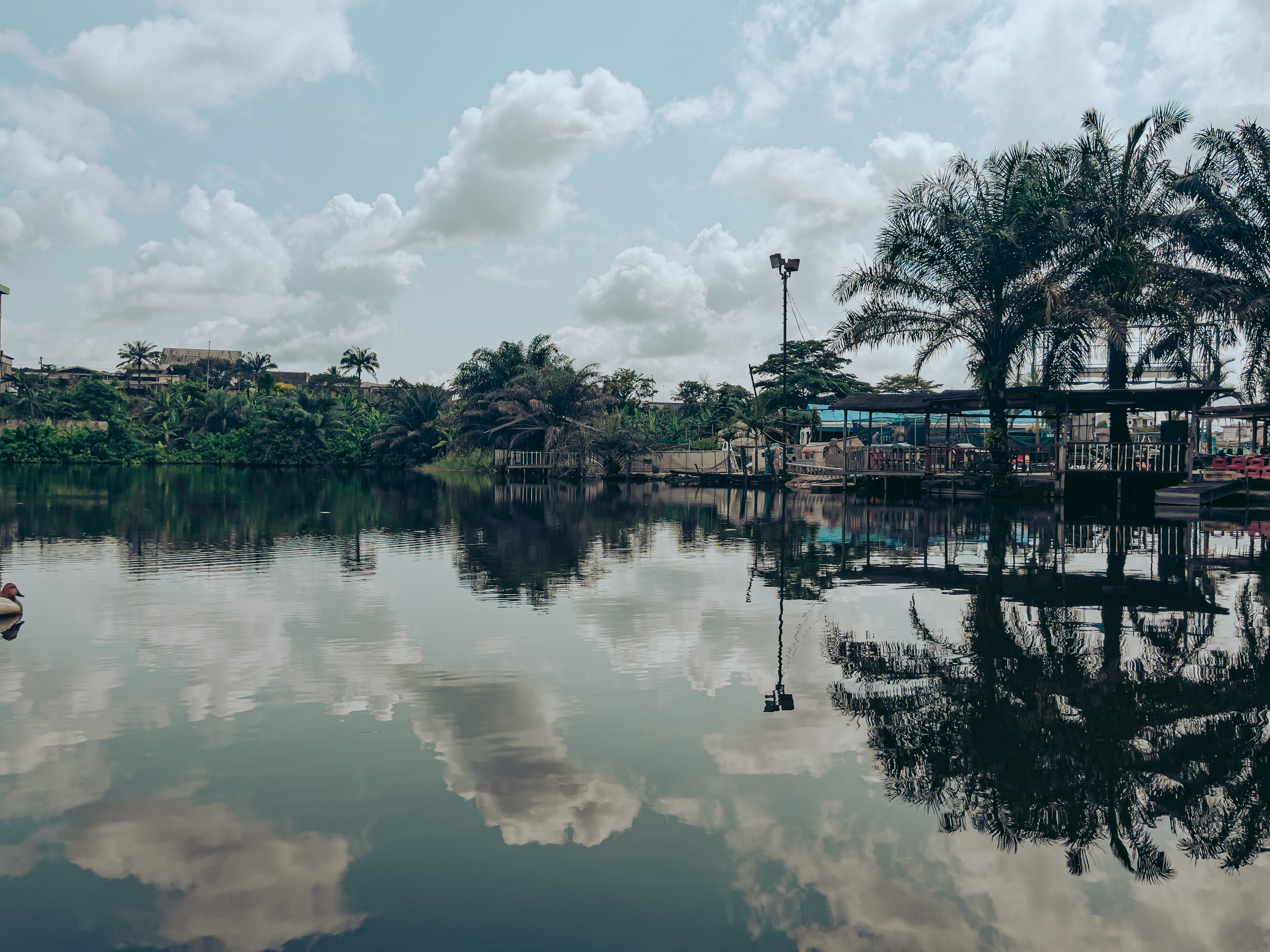
Lake Parcour Vita

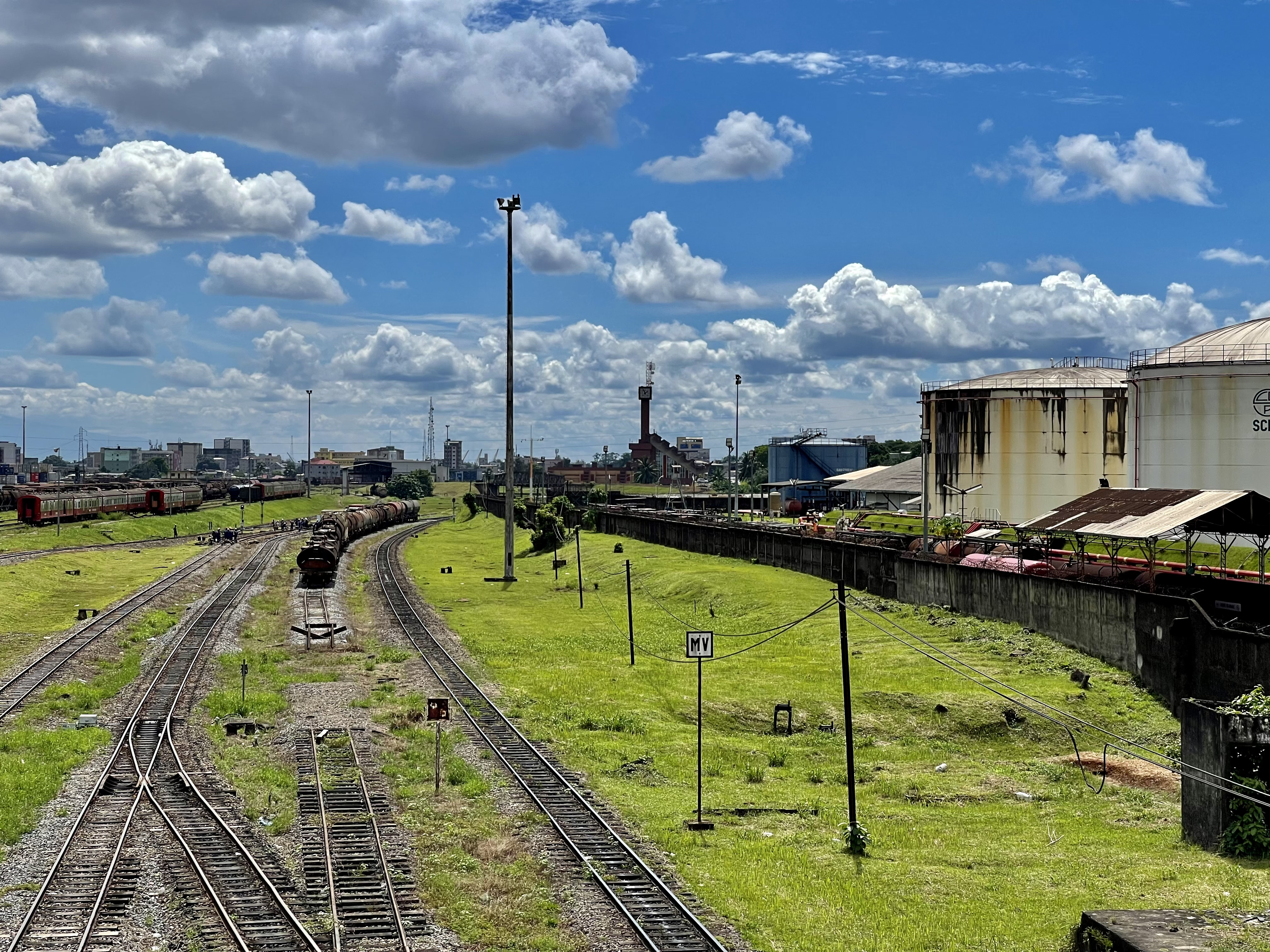
Cameroon Petroleum Depot Company

=== Name ===
With the arrival of the Portuguese in the 15th century, the area was known as Rio dos Camarões. Before coming under German rule in 1884, the town was also known as Cameroons Town; thereafter it became Kamerunstadt ("Cameroon City"), the capital of German Kamerun. It was renamed Douala in 1907 after the name of the natives known as Dua ala Ijaws (Njos), and became part of French Cameroon in 1919. Many of the Ijaw (Njo) natives migrated to the Niger Delta in Nigeria during the Portuguese era.

== Geography ==
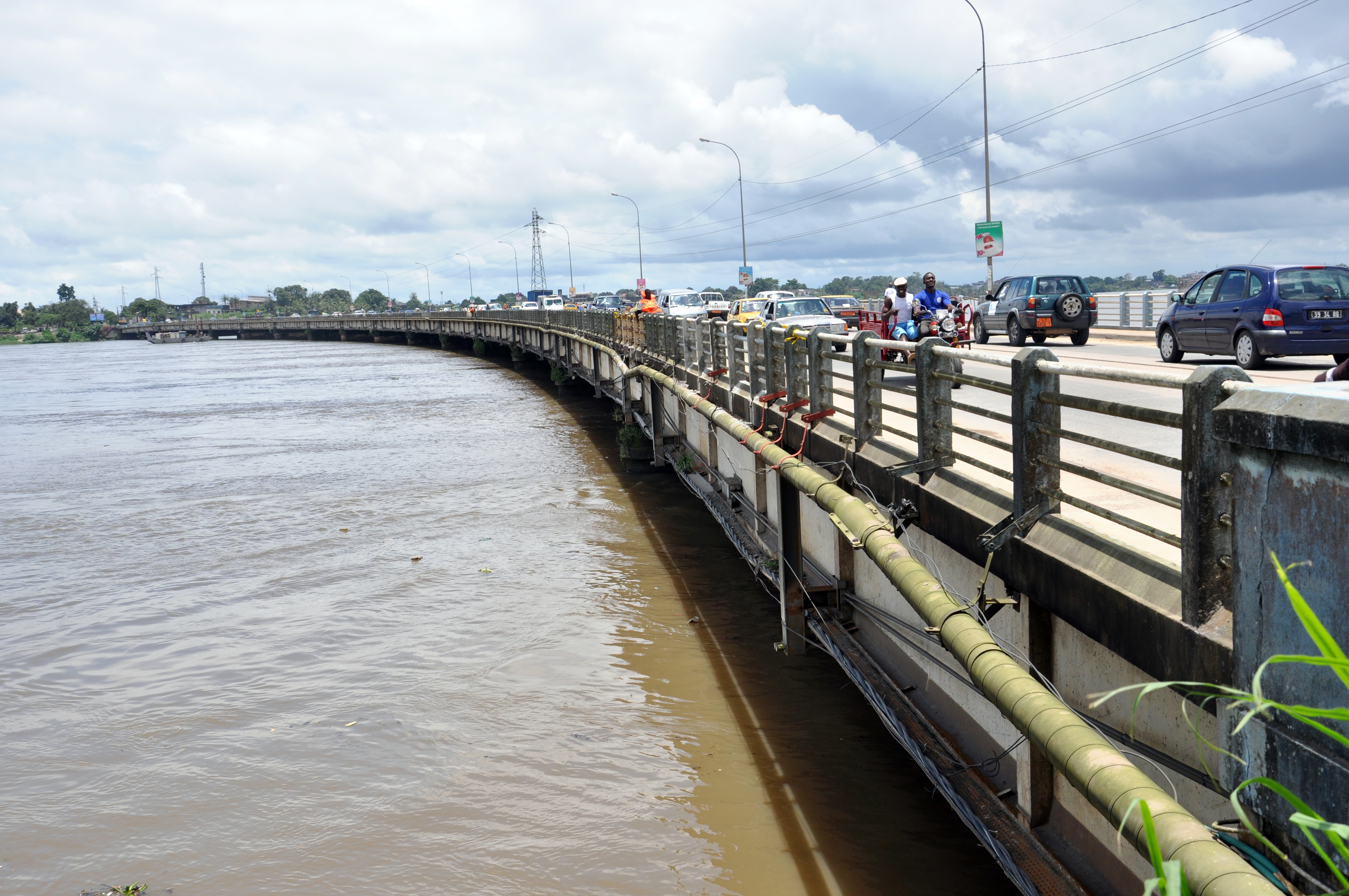
Bridge over the Wouri River

Douala is the largest city in Cameroon. It is on the Atlantic Ocean coast approximately 130 miles (210 km) west of Yaoundé. The city is located on the banks of the Wouri River, the two sides linked by Bonaberi Bridge.

=== Climate ===
Douala features a tropical monsoon climate (Köppen climate classification Am), with relatively consistent temperatures throughout the course of the year, though the city experiences somewhat cooler temperatures in July and August. Douala typically features warm and humid conditions with an average annual temperature of 27.0 °C (80.6 °F) and an average humidity of 83%. Douala sees plentiful rainfall during the course of the year, experiencing on average roughly 3,600 millimetres (140 in) of precipitation per year. Its driest month is December, when on average 28 millimetres (1.1 in) of precipitation falls, while its wettest month is August, when on average nearly 700 millimetres (28 in) of rain falls.

Climate data for Douala (1991-2020, extremes 1885–present)
Month	Jan	Feb	Mar	Apr	May	Jun	Jul	Aug	Sep	Oct	Nov	Dec	Year
Record high °C (°F)	36.2 (97.2)	39.8 (103.6)	36.8 (98.2)	37.1 (98.8)	36.9 (98.4)	39.0 (102.2)	32.5 (90.5)	32.0 (89.6)	33.1 (91.6)	35.0 (95.0)	35.7 (96.3)	36.1 (97.0)	39.8 (103.6)
Mean daily maximum °C (°F)	32.8 (91.0)	33.3 (91.9)	32.8 (91.0)	32.2 (90.0)	32.2 (90.0)	30.6 (87.1)	28.3 (82.9)	28.3 (82.9)	29.4 (84.9)	30.6 (87.1)	31.1 (88.0)	32.2 (90.0)	31.2 (88.2)
Daily mean °C (°F)	28.5 (83.3)	28.9 (84.0)	28.5 (83.3)	28.1 (82.6)	27.9 (82.2)	26.9 (80.4)	25.9 (78.6)	25.6 (78.1)	26.2 (79.2)	26.8 (80.2)	27.5 (81.5)	28.3 (82.9)	27.3 (81.1)
Mean daily minimum °C (°F)	24.4 (75.9)	24.4 (75.9)	24.4 (75.9)	23.9 (75.0)	23.9 (75.0)	23.3 (73.9)	23.3 (73.9)	23.3 (73.9)	23.3 (73.9)	23.3 (73.9)	23.9 (75.0)	23.9 (75.0)	23.7 (74.7)
Record low °C (°F)	18.0 (64.4)	19.0 (66.2)	18.0 (64.4)	18.3 (64.9)	16.0 (60.8)	18.2 (64.8)	18.2 (64.8)	19.0 (66.2)	18.5 (65.3)	16.8 (62.2)	18.5 (65.3)	18.0 (64.4)	16.0 (60.8)
Average precipitation mm (inches)	35.6 (1.40)	55.9 (2.20)	154.9 (6.10)	238.8 (9.40)	274.3 (10.80)	355.6 (14.00)	680.7 (26.80)	690.9 (27.20)	558.8 (22.00)	403.9 (15.90)	124.5 (4.90)	30.5 (1.20)	3,604.4 (141.91)
Average precipitation days (≥ 0.1 mm)	5	9	15	18	21	23	27	30	26	24	12	5	215
Average relative humidity (%)	78.5	81.2	80.9	79.5	77.4	76.8	75.1	73.4	72.8	73.1	73.5	74.9	76.4
Average dew point °C (°F)	23.9 (75.0)	24.2 (75.6)	24.1 (75.4)	24.0 (75.2)	23.9 (75.0)	23.4 (74.1)	22.8 (73.0)	22.5 (72.5)	23.1 (73.6)	23.5 (74.3)	23.8 (74.8)	23.9 (75.0)	23.6 (74.5)
Mean monthly sunshine hours	194.3	180.2	170.5	175.4	175.1	125.2	70.4	55.3	90.5	115.1	145.4	175.5	1,722.9
Source 1: World Meteorological Organization Meteo Climat (record highs and lows)
Source 2: Deutscher Wetterdienst (humidity, 1957-1990), NOAA (sun, 1961-1990), Weather.Directory, World Meteorological Organization (1991–2020 Normals) & Direction de la Météorologie Nationale du Cameroun / Historical Archives (Extremes 1885–present)

== Population ==
Evolution of population in Douala (in thousands)

Year	1916	1920	1924	1927	1931	1933	1935	1937	1939	1941
Population	29.4	26.4	44.5	54.6	37	52.6	56.5	79.4	69.8	76.7

Year	1944	1947	1949	1954	1956	1976	1987	1991	1999	2005	2015
Population	73.8	115.5	77.6	192.4	224.3	637	810	884	1448.3	1907	2768.4

With 1.9 million inhabitants in 2005, Douala is the most populated city of Cameroon.

=== Languages ===
Cameroon is home to nearly 250 languages or dialects. The local indigenous language is Duala, which shares its name with the city. French and English are official languages, but Duala is the city's lingua franca. In 2014, 63.7% of Douala inhabitants of over 15 years knew how to read and write French, while 76.4% knew how to speak and understand it.

== Urbanism and contemporary life ==
The city of Douala is divided into seven districts (Akwa, Bassa, Bonabéri, Bonapriso, Bonanjo, Deïdo and New Bell) and it has more than 120 neighbourhoods.

Some of the neighbourhoods of Douala include

- Akwa. Akwa is Douala's business district and Bonanjo its administrative district. Plateau Joss is the name used historically for the current district of Akwa. The name of the districts refer to the Douala lineage, as well as the neighborhoods. For example, Akwa was historically divided between Bell and Deido into Bonadibong, Bonamilengue, Boneleke, Bonalembe, Bonejang, Bonamuti, Bonabekombo, Bonaboijan, and Bonakuamuang; the prefix "bona" means "descendant of".
Akwa main places

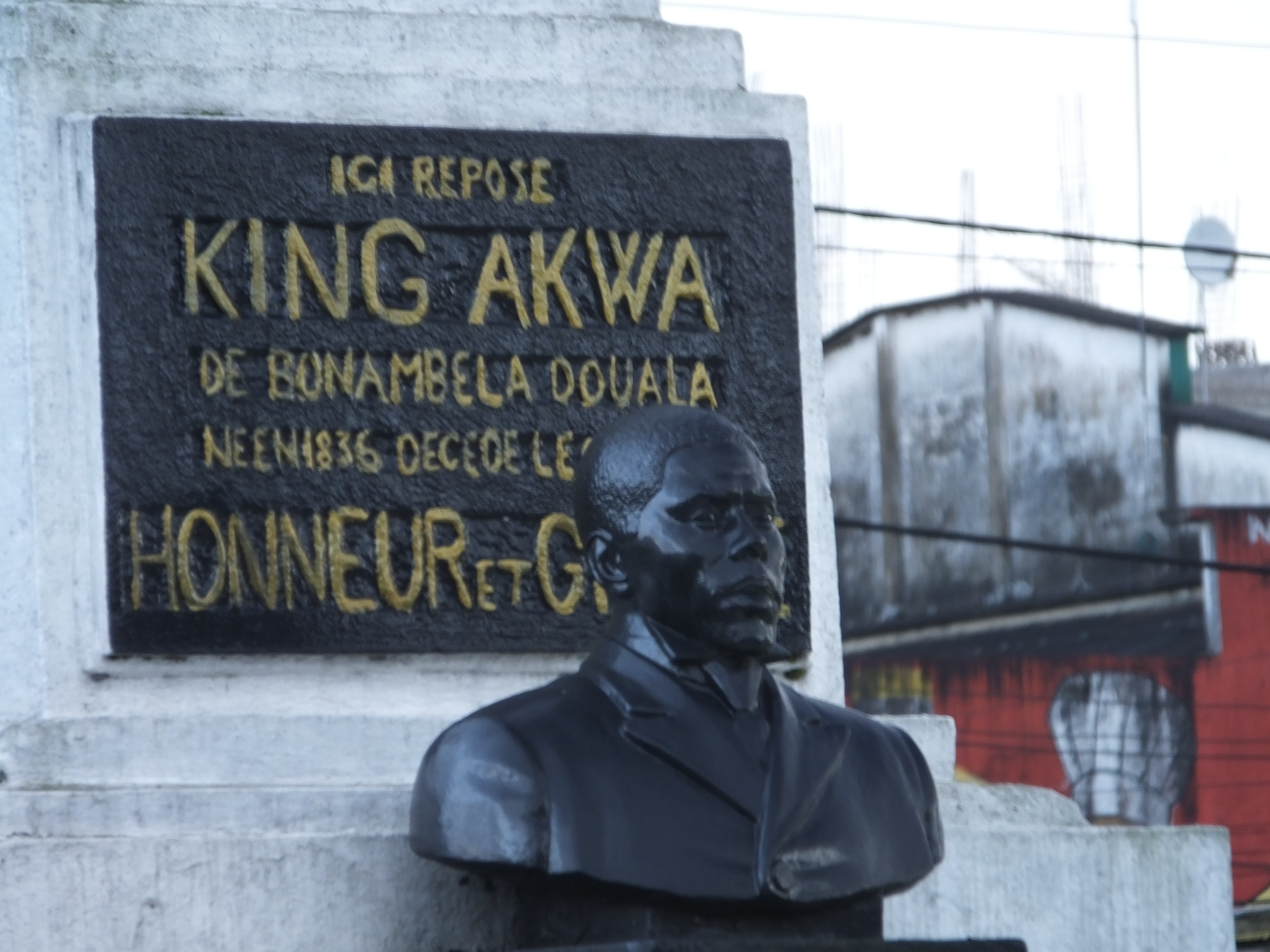
Akwa Kings Monument

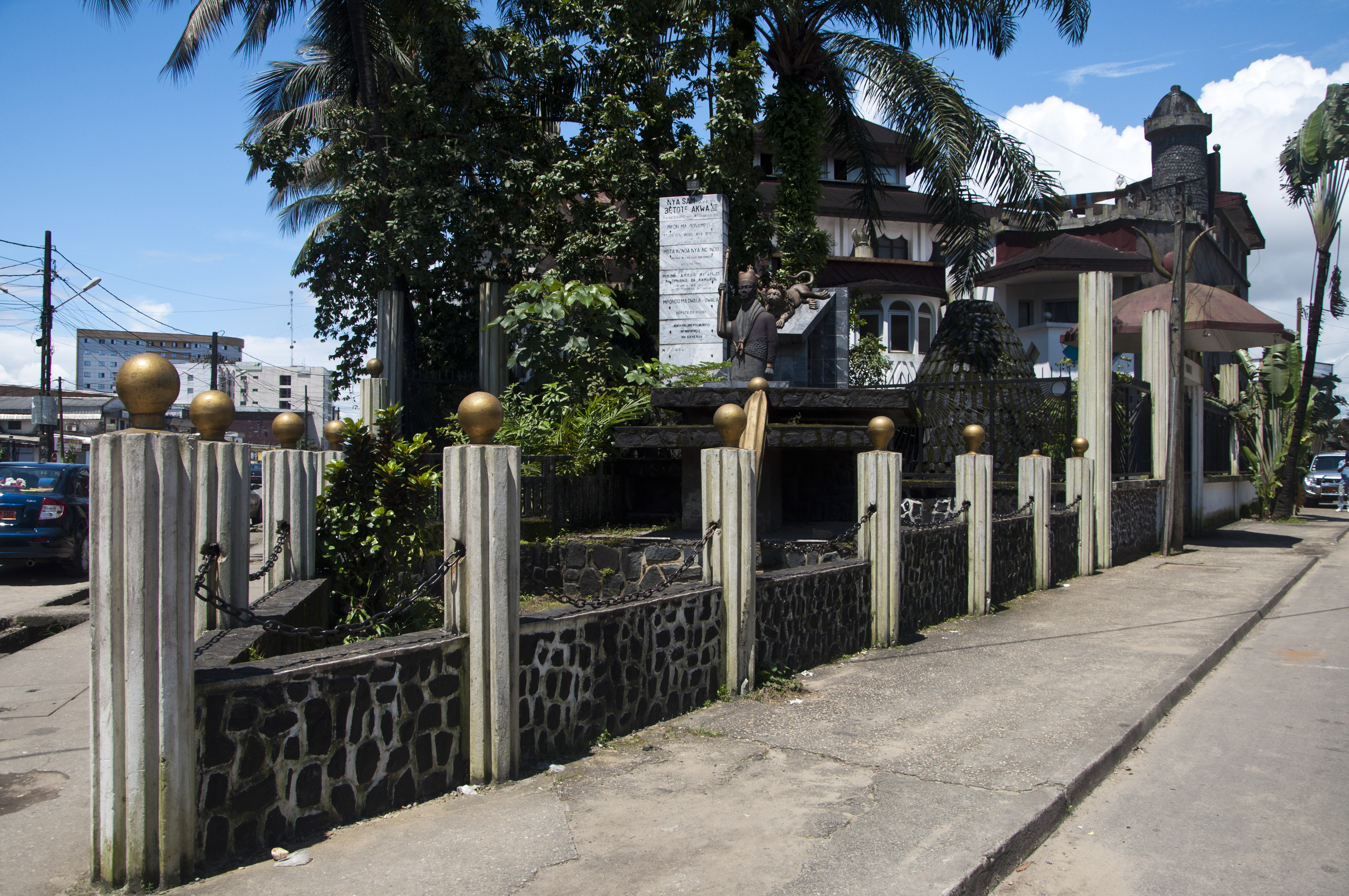
Palais Dika Akwa

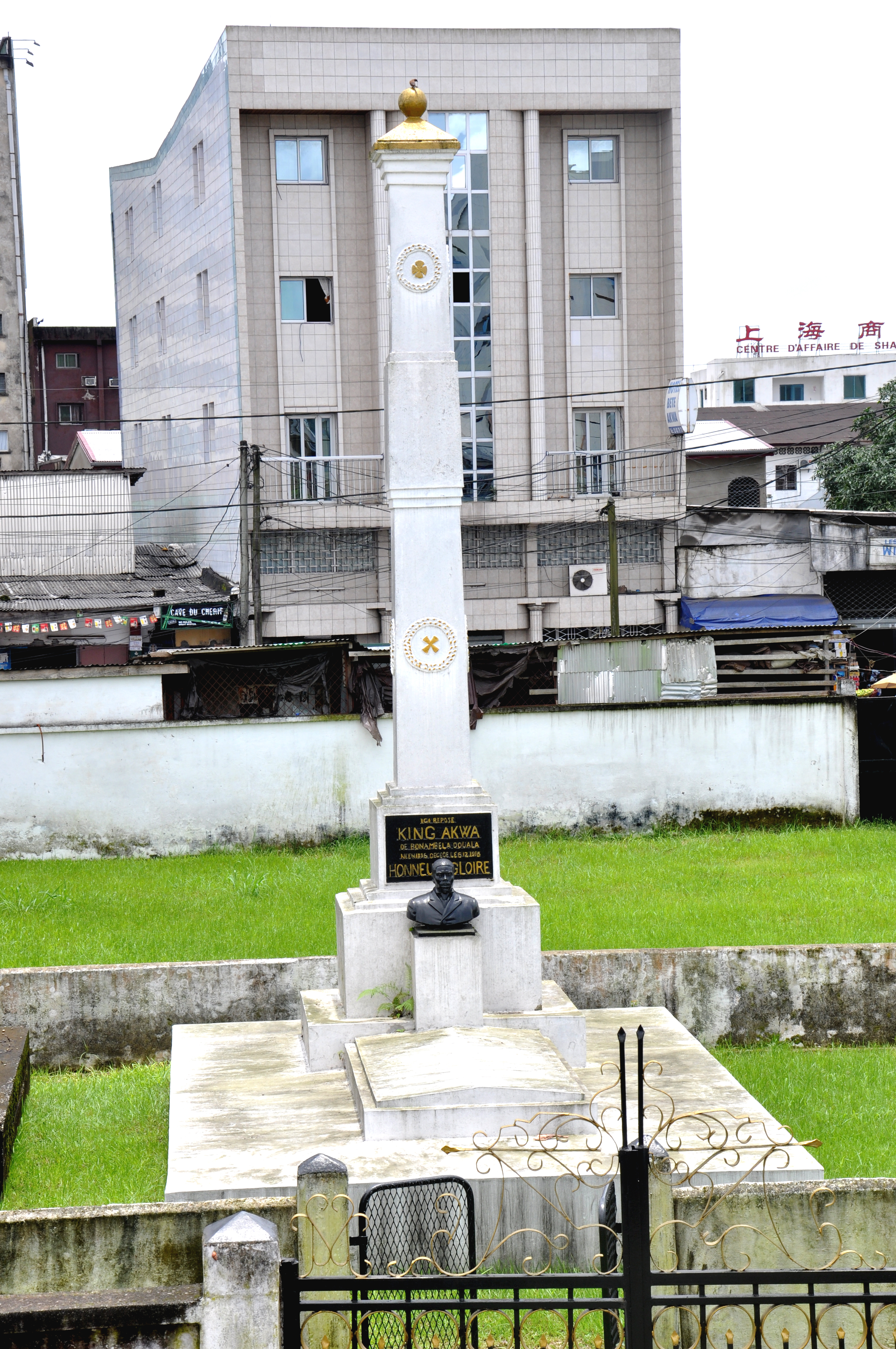
Akwa King tomb

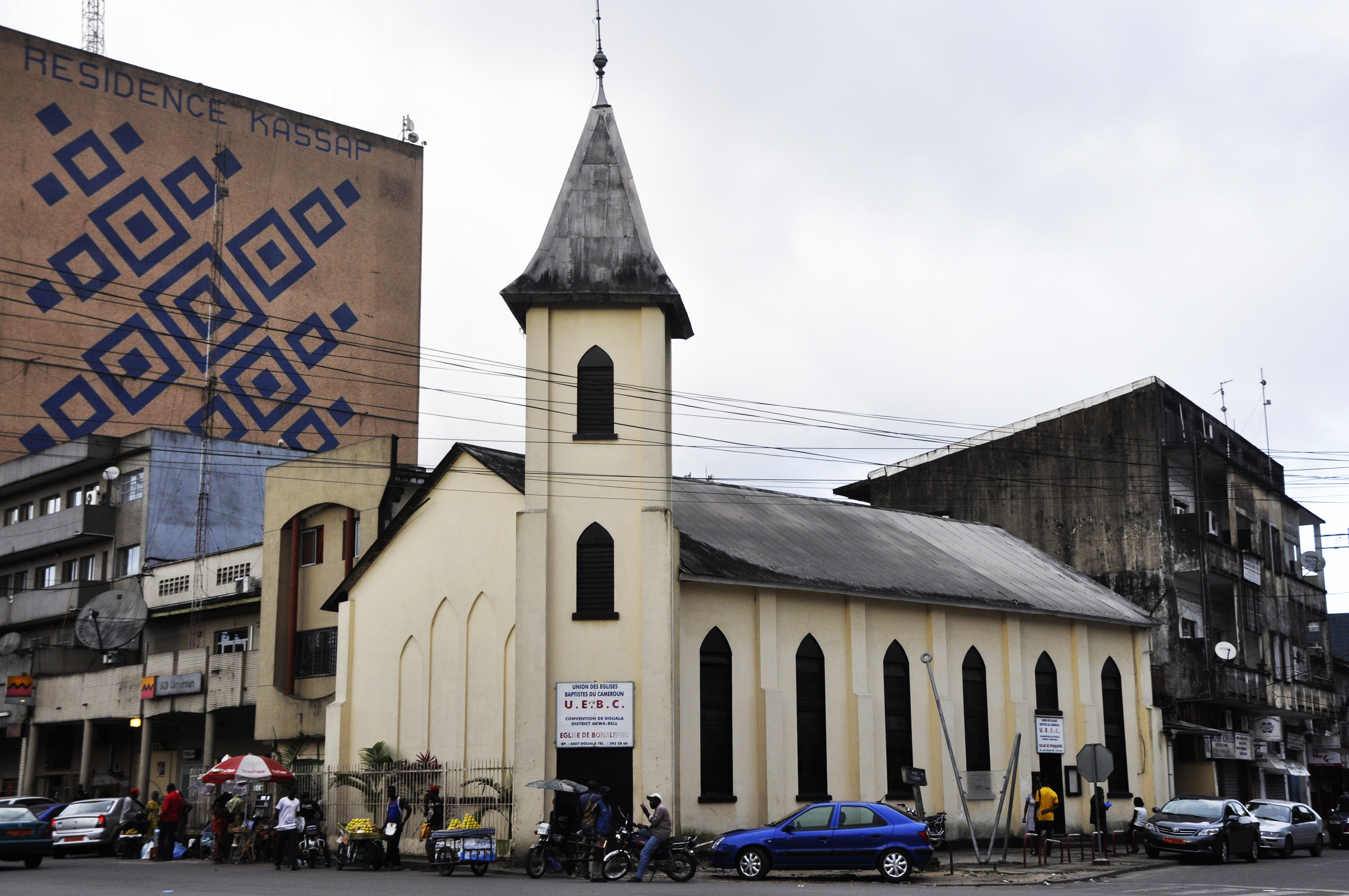
Bonalembe Baptist church

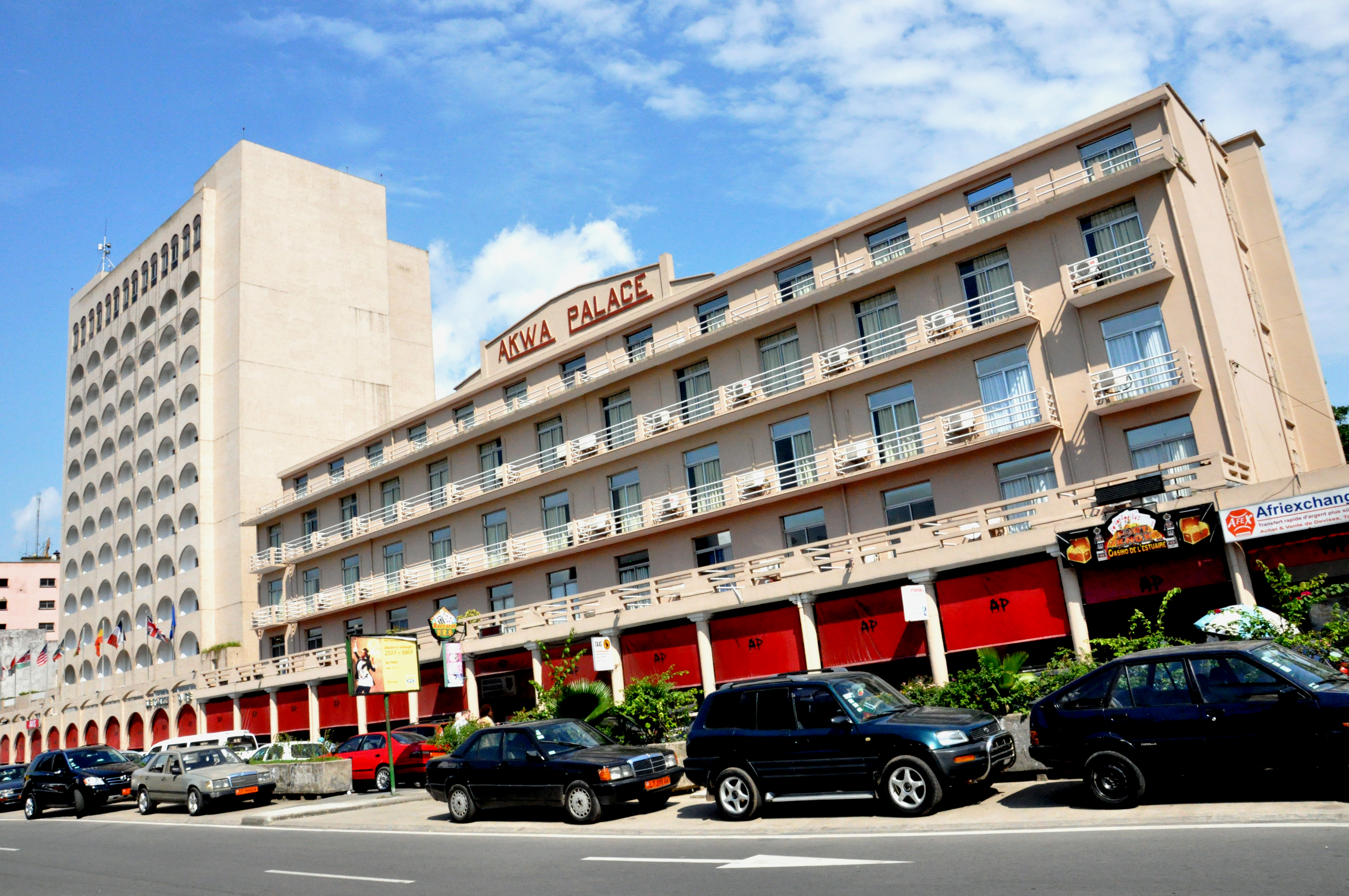
Akwa Palace
Petit mosque Bonadibong
- Bali, housing area located near Bonanjo administrative area.
- Bépanda is a very densely populated neighbourhood. It is probably the most inhabited area of the city with many residents having arrived from West Africa and from all parts of the country. The seat of the University of Douala and an important telecommunication centre of Cameroon's telecommunications are located there.
- Deido is a historical neighborhood located in the north central part of the city. It includes one of the main junctions of the city known as Le Rond-Point Deïdo and the symbol of the city “the Njounjou” (“the monster”).
- Bonaberi is located on the right bank of the Wouri River. It is primarily an industrial neighbourhood but is gradually becoming a mixed area including more residential and commercial areas. It is connected by the two only bridges of the city. It is also the main opening toward the western anglophone area of the country.
- Bonapriso is one of the wealthiest area of the city and even of the country. Historically a residential neighbourhood, it has become a mixed area including commercial galleries, restaurants and shops.
- Bonanjo is the administrative neighborhood, with many large administrations, larger companies and banks offices, with higher buildings than the rest of the city
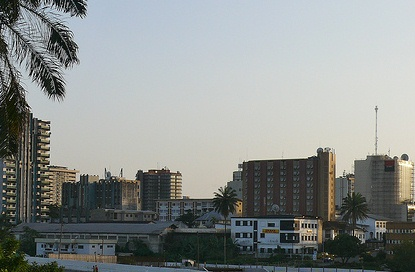
  Bonanjo, administrative centre.
- Bonamoussadi is the main housing area located in the northern part of the city. In a first time very residential, it has recently witnessed a significant surge in the installation of malls, supermarkets, restaurants and even night clubs.
- Kotto is a modern residential neighbourhood next to Bonamoussadi. It developed in the early 1980s with the housing projects of the Société immobilière du Cameroun (SIC) and is now the prime area for the small but increasing middle and upper classes of the city.
- New Bell is an historical neighbourhood of the city. It was founded in the early 20th century with the expropriation by the Germans of the natives Duala people from the plateau Joss. It has been known since then for housing newcomers in the city from all parts of the country and even from abroad (mainly west Africa). It today a very populous neighbourhood with very tough conditions. Two of the main markets of the city (Central market and Marché Nkololoun) are in the area.
New Bell main places

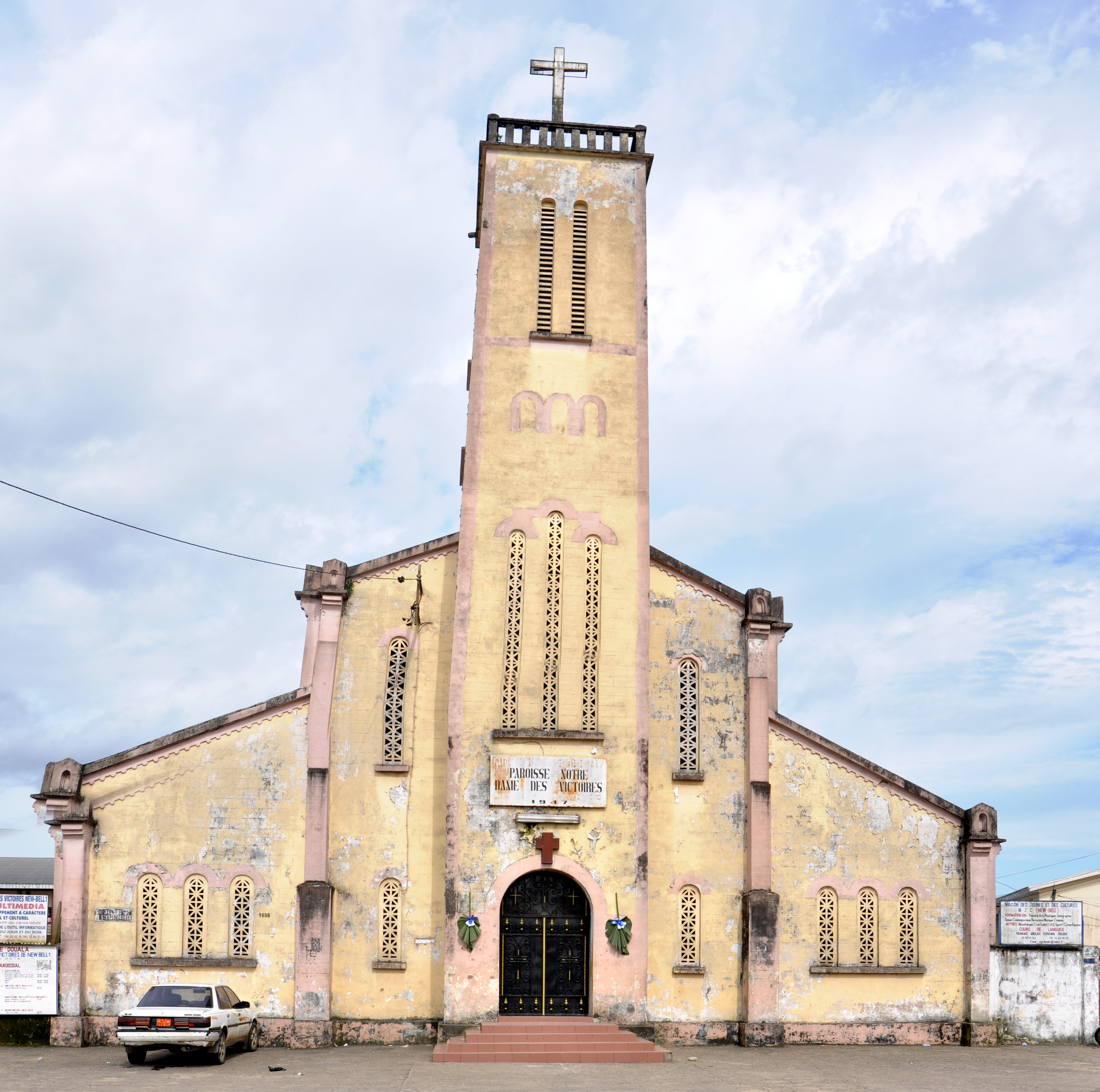
Church of Our Lady of Victories

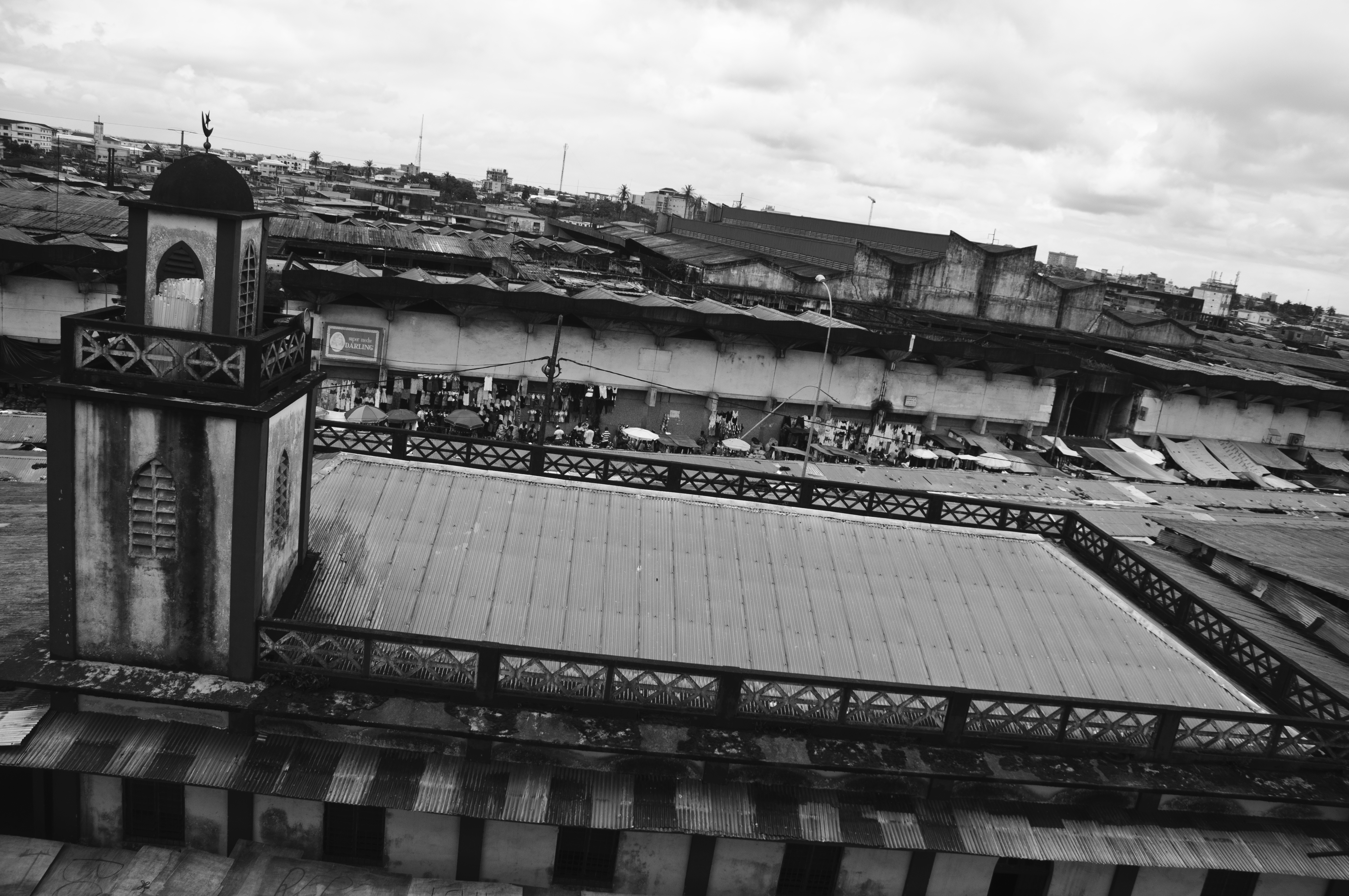
central mosque

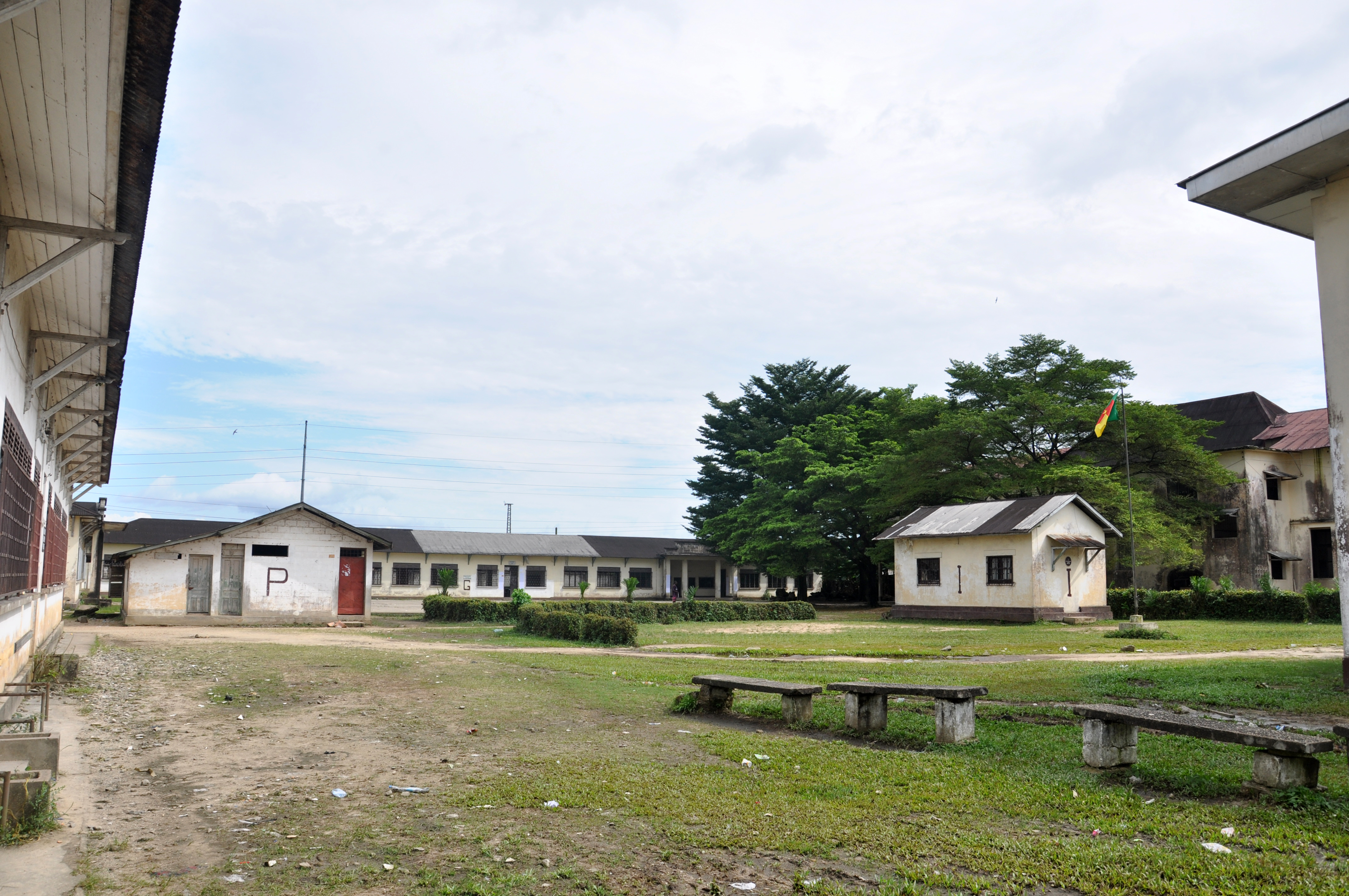
NewBell High School
- Bassa is a vast area in the eastern part of the city. It is a mixed area including many neighborhoods (some wealthier than others) such as Logbaba, Ndogpassi, Cité des Palmiers, PK 8 and many others. It also includes one of the two major industrial zones of the city (the other being in Bonaberi).

== Architecture ==
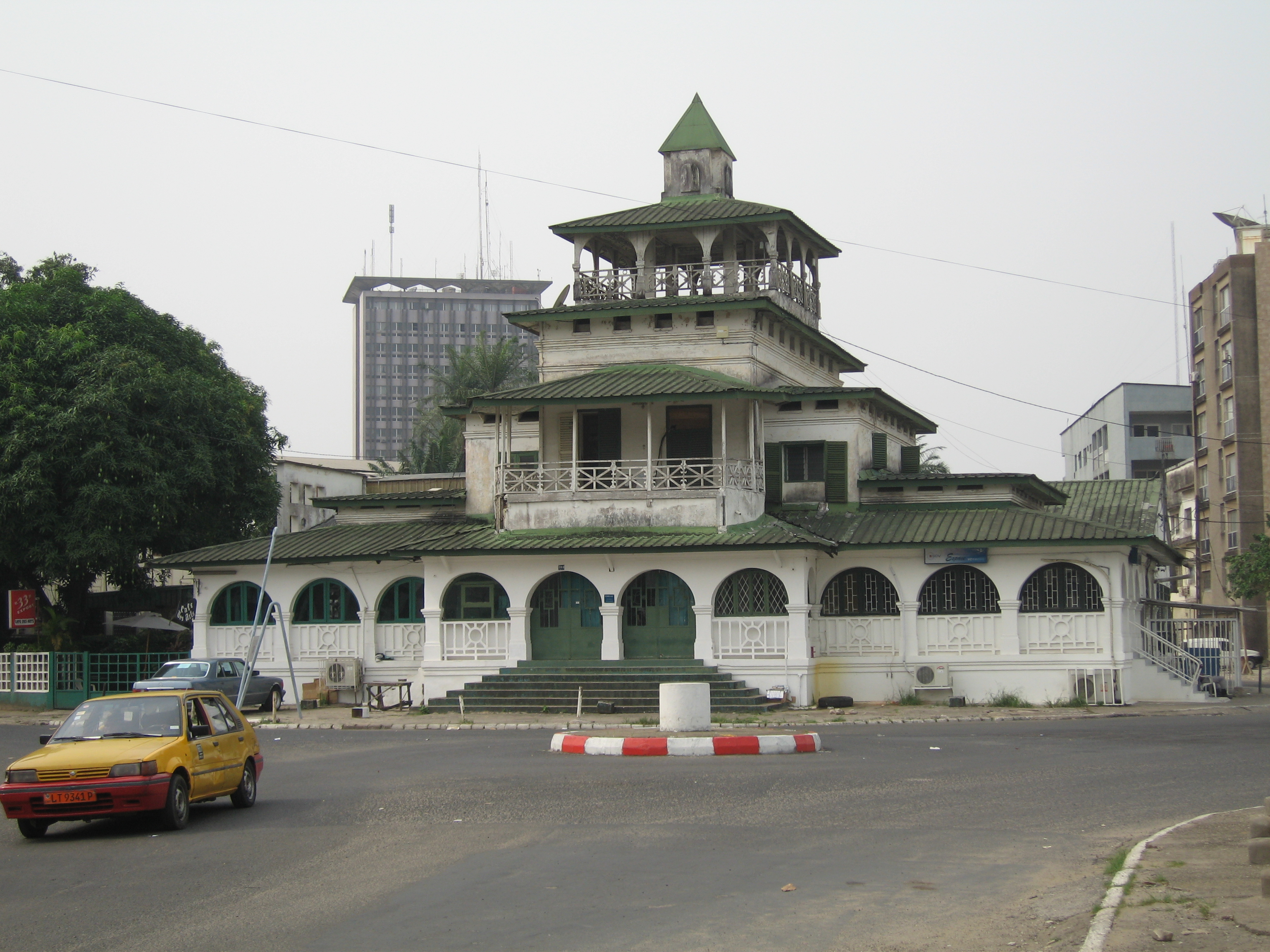
Palace of the Kings Bell

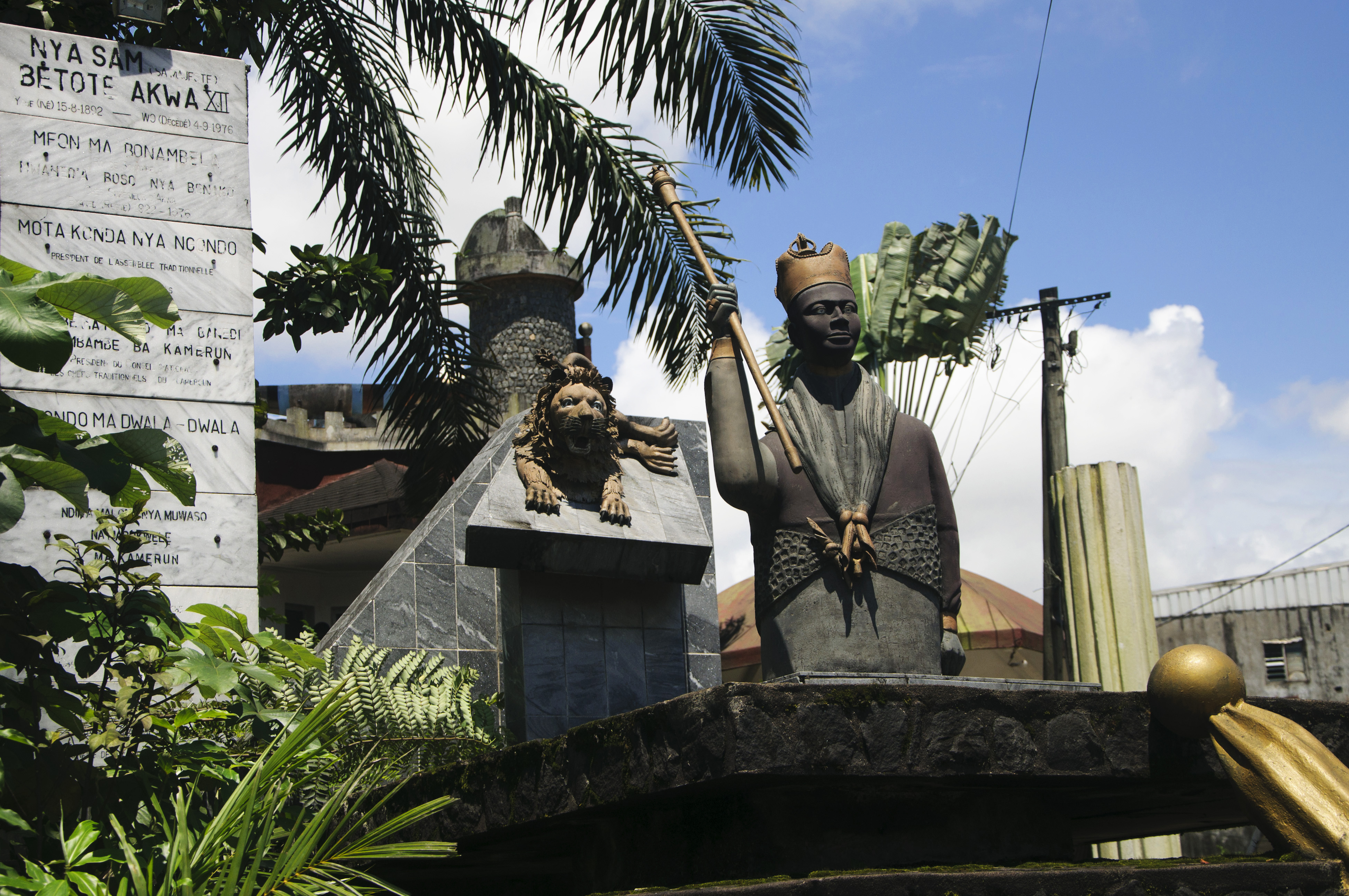
Statue of King Akwa in front of the King Akwa Museum

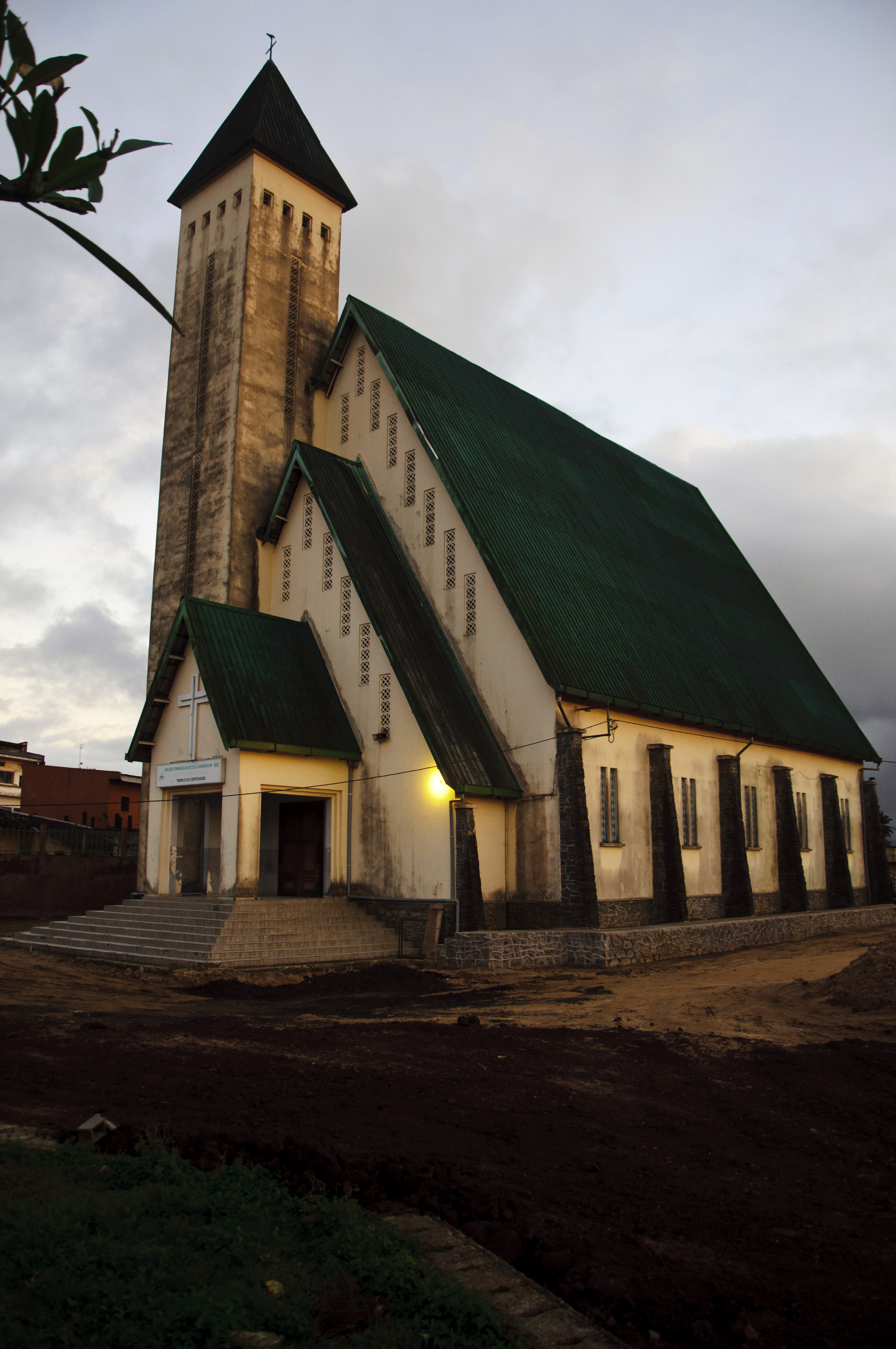
Centennial Temple

According to Jacques Soulillou, historical images of Douala document the areas of Akwa (Plateau Joss) and the port between 1860 and 1960, while the districts of Bonaberi, Deido and New Bell have almost no images. The archives which provide documentation about the city are based in Paris, Basel, Hamburg, Potsdam, Douala and Yaoundé.

In 1896 a first urban plan of the city was developed during the German colonial period. The plan included a hospital, the governor residency, the palace of justice, the police station, administrative buildings and buildings for the port and customs (among those the Old Woermann Linie Bachelors House). The Bonakouamouang Chimney also dates back to this period. In 1904 construction of the Villa Mandessi Bell was begun. In 1905 the palace of the King Manga Ndumbe Bell (also called la Pagode) was built, and in 1906 the general plan of Gross Douala was established. In 1914 the large population living in Bonanjo was moved to the new estate of Neue Bell (New Bell).

Between 1925 and 1930, during the French colonial period, the chamber of commerce, the new palace of justice, the new railway station, the vault of the Kings Bell and the catholic cathedral of Saints Peter and Paul were built. Constructions were intensified between 1930 and 1955 and in 1955 the bridge on Wouri River was built. In 1935 the Mausoleum of the Kings Akwa was constructed. In 1947 the Temple of the Centenary was built. In 1959 a new city plan was designed (Plan Dorian); according to Danièle Diwouta-Kotto, this plan is still influencing Douala's urban development. After the independence of 1960 a new development and urban plan were established. In 1998 a research prepared the diagnostic for the 2015 horizon. In 2005 a new development and urban plan was designed and routes and public canalizations were reestablished and created. In the same year the Project Sawa-Beach was launched. Since 1888, terracotta bricks have been produced in Douala.

The publication Suites architecturales focuses on heritage and reappropriation in the architecture of Douala, and it presents some of the characteristics of the buildings and architecture of Douala after its independence. Among those buildings are the casino, the show-room La Meublerie, the exhibition hall Cami-Toyota, Union Bank of Cameroon, Immeuble Hollando, the Baptist church, Immeuble Victoria, headquarters of CA-SCB, espace doual'art, and Orange Flagship. The Palace Dika Akwa Mukanda was built in 1990.

Along the city's main thoroughfare lie some of Cameroon's best restaurants, coffee houses and French-style patisseries; along the waterfront, many bars and bistros may be found, commanding views of the Gulf of Guinea and nearby mangrove swamps. Many of these are frequented by the city's large expatriate population, mainly French or Lebanese, most of whom work in the petroleum industry.

== Culture ==
- Douala Maritime Museum, a museum showcasing the rich maritime history of Douala. The building is shaped like a boat (however, the museum only occupies 400 m^{2} of the building). It is located in the administrative area Bonanjo
- Doual'art, an art gallery/center
- La Nouvelle Liberté, a 12m piece from Joseph Francis Sumégné inaugurated in 2007. A permanent monumental sculpture made with recycled material located at a main roundabout in Douala. It is 12 meters high with a wingspan of 5 meters.
- The Cathedral of St Peter and St Paul
- The Centennial Temple
Images of the statue of Liberty in Douala

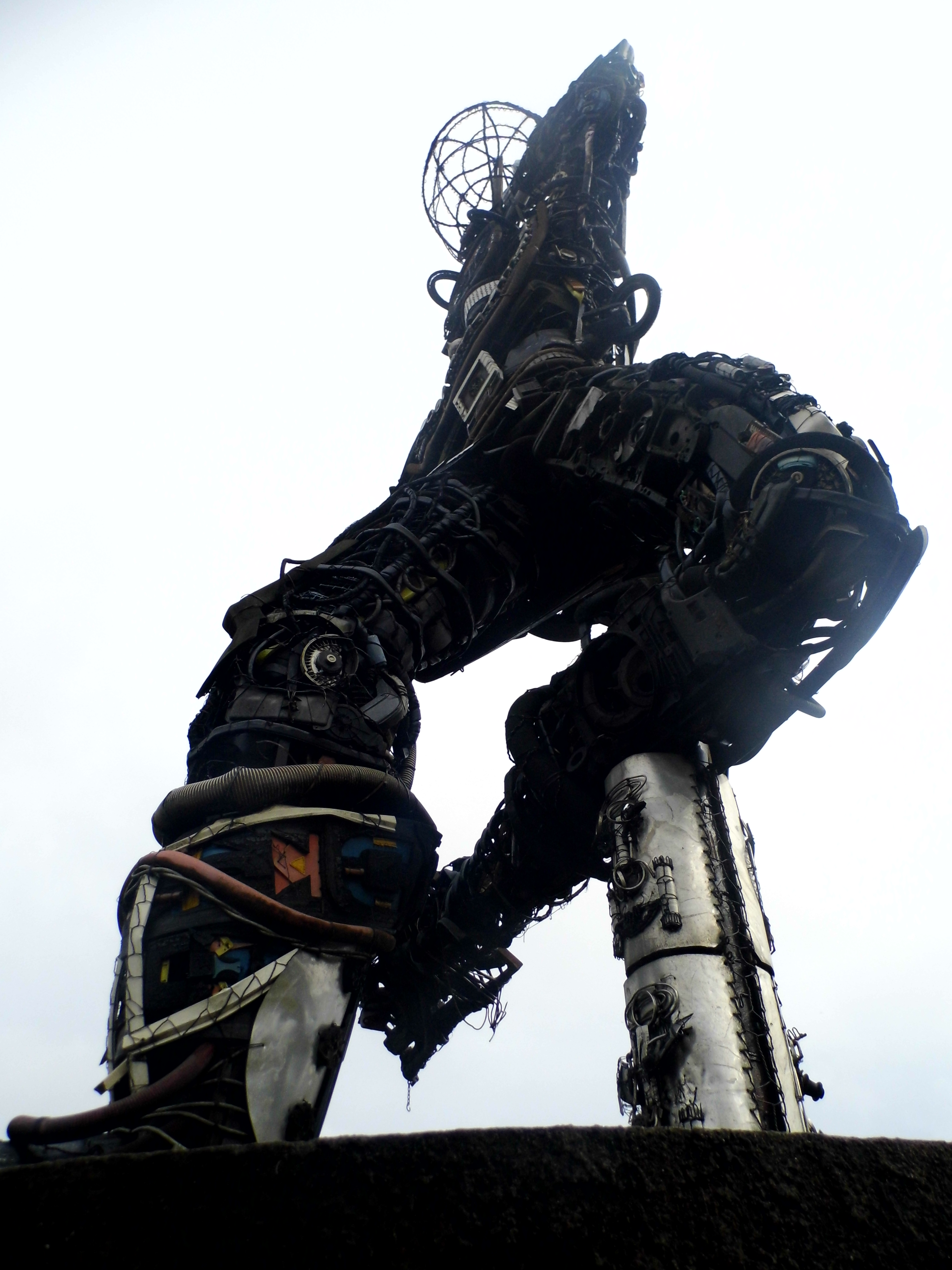

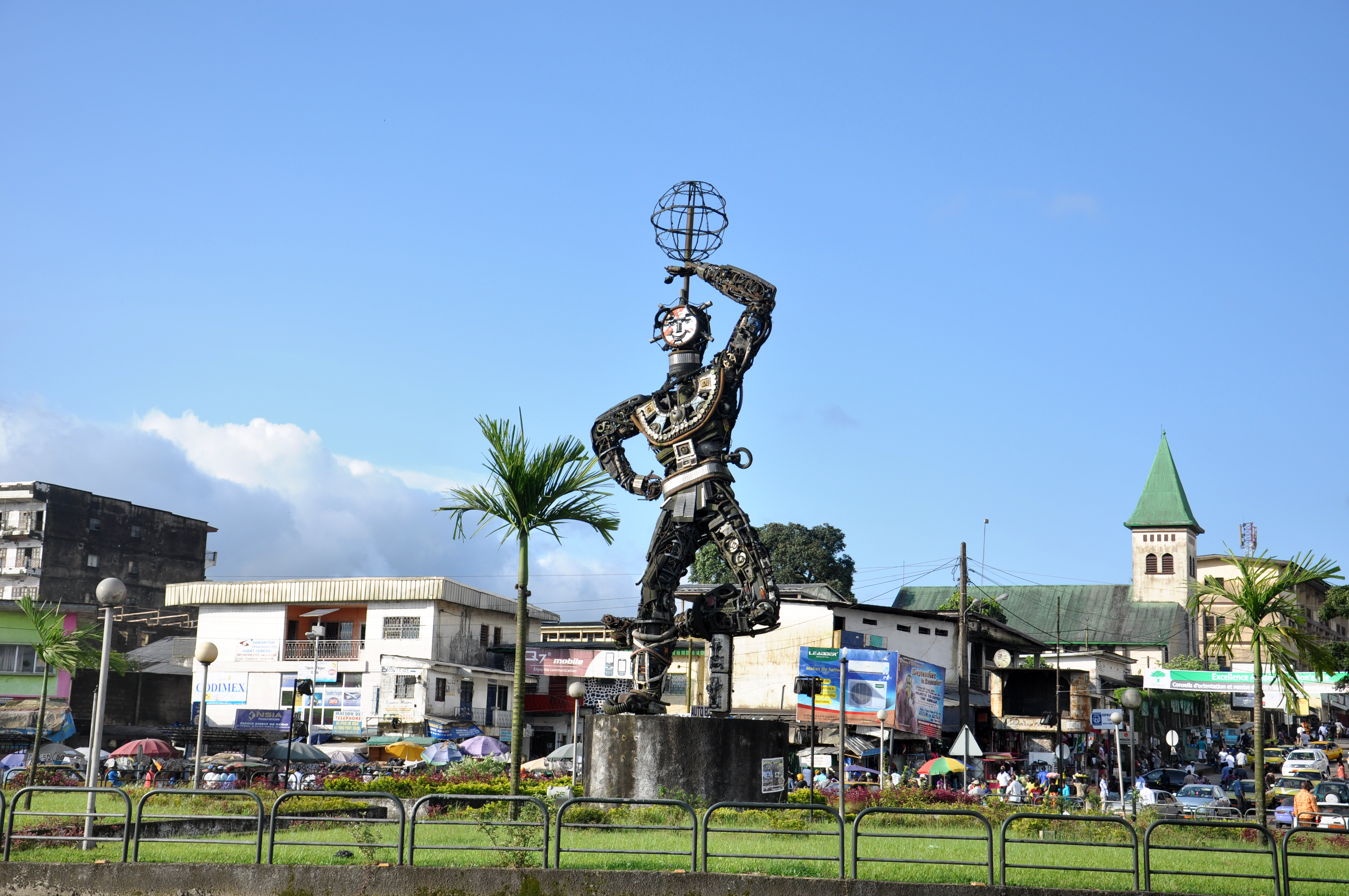

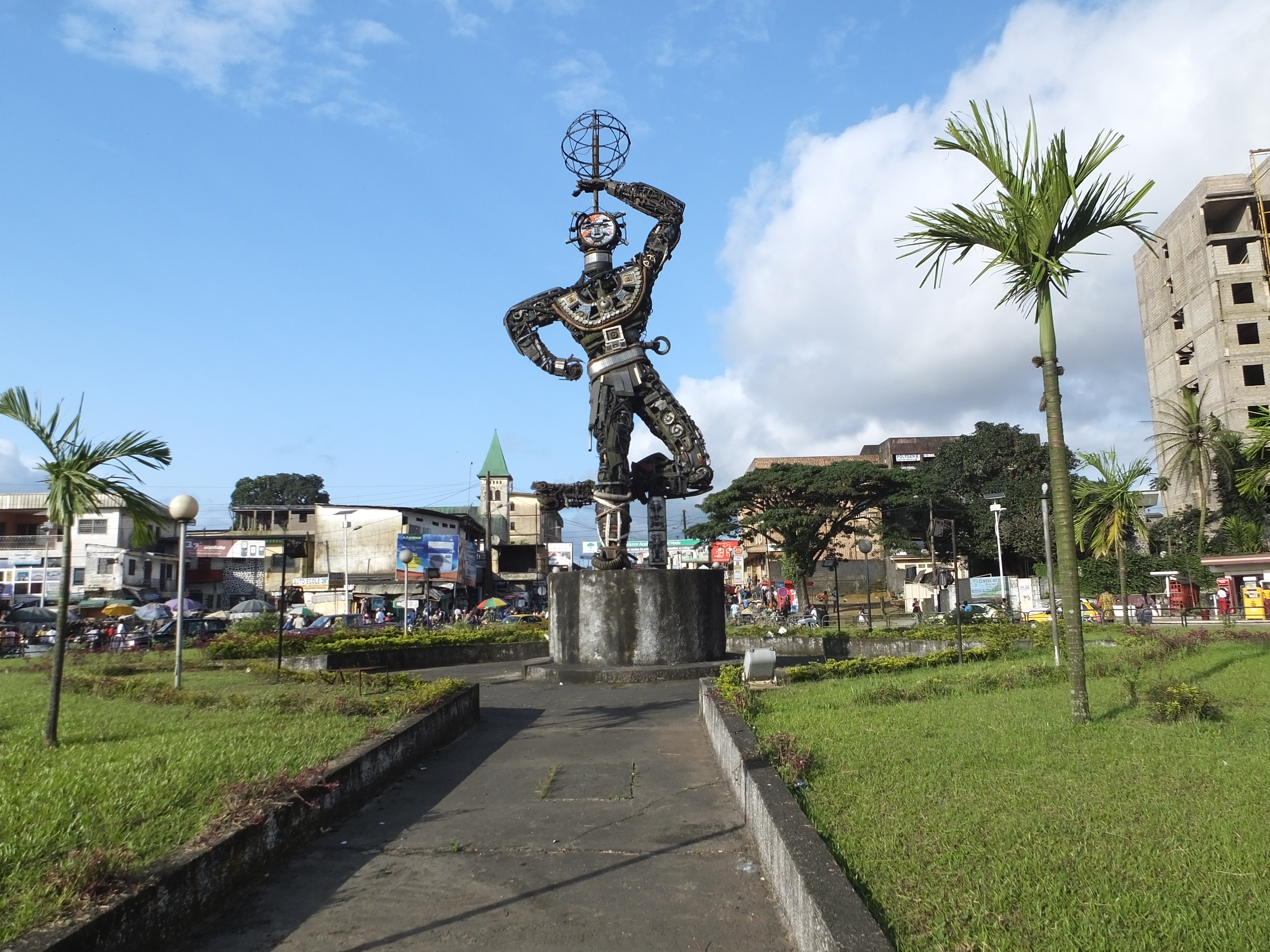

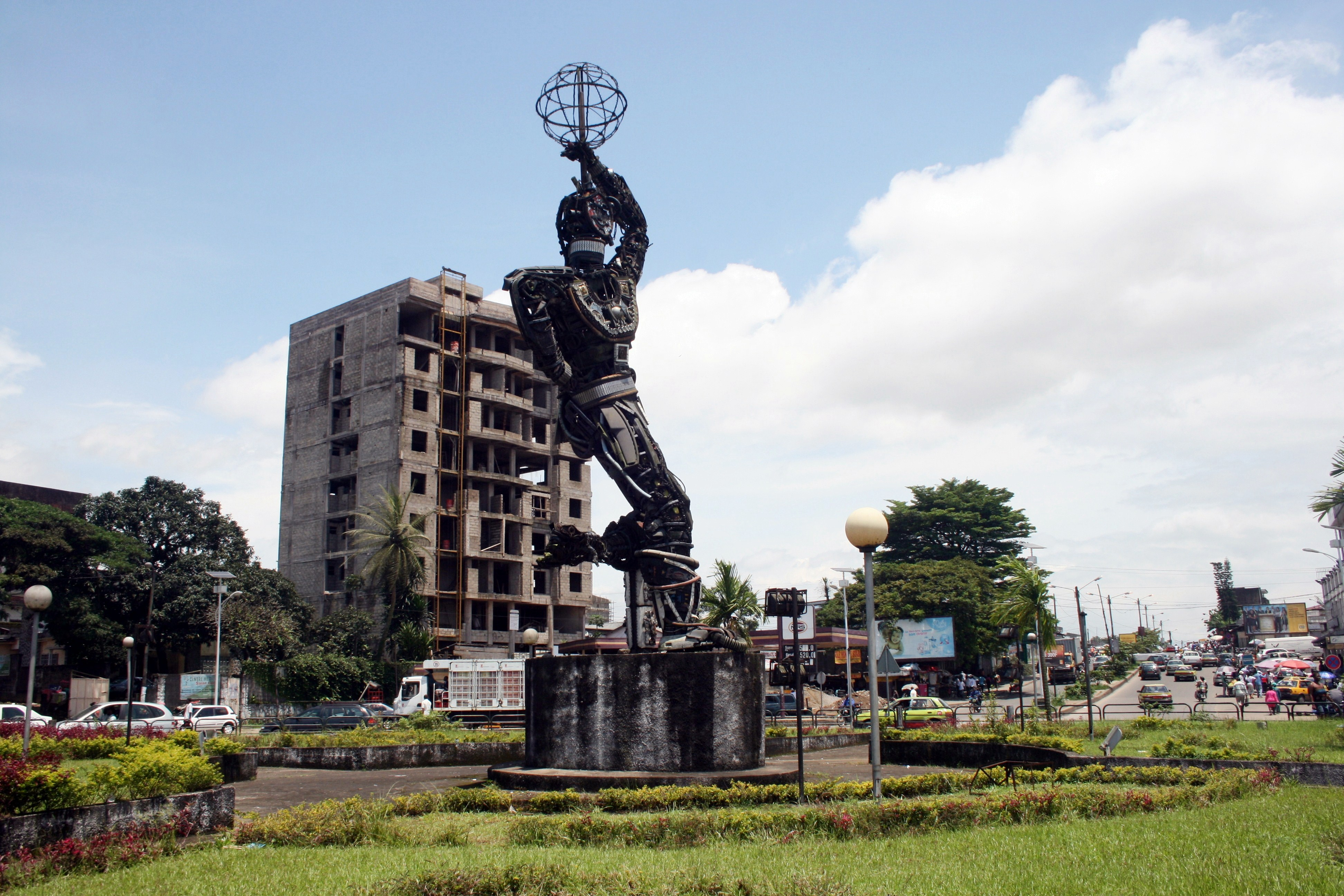

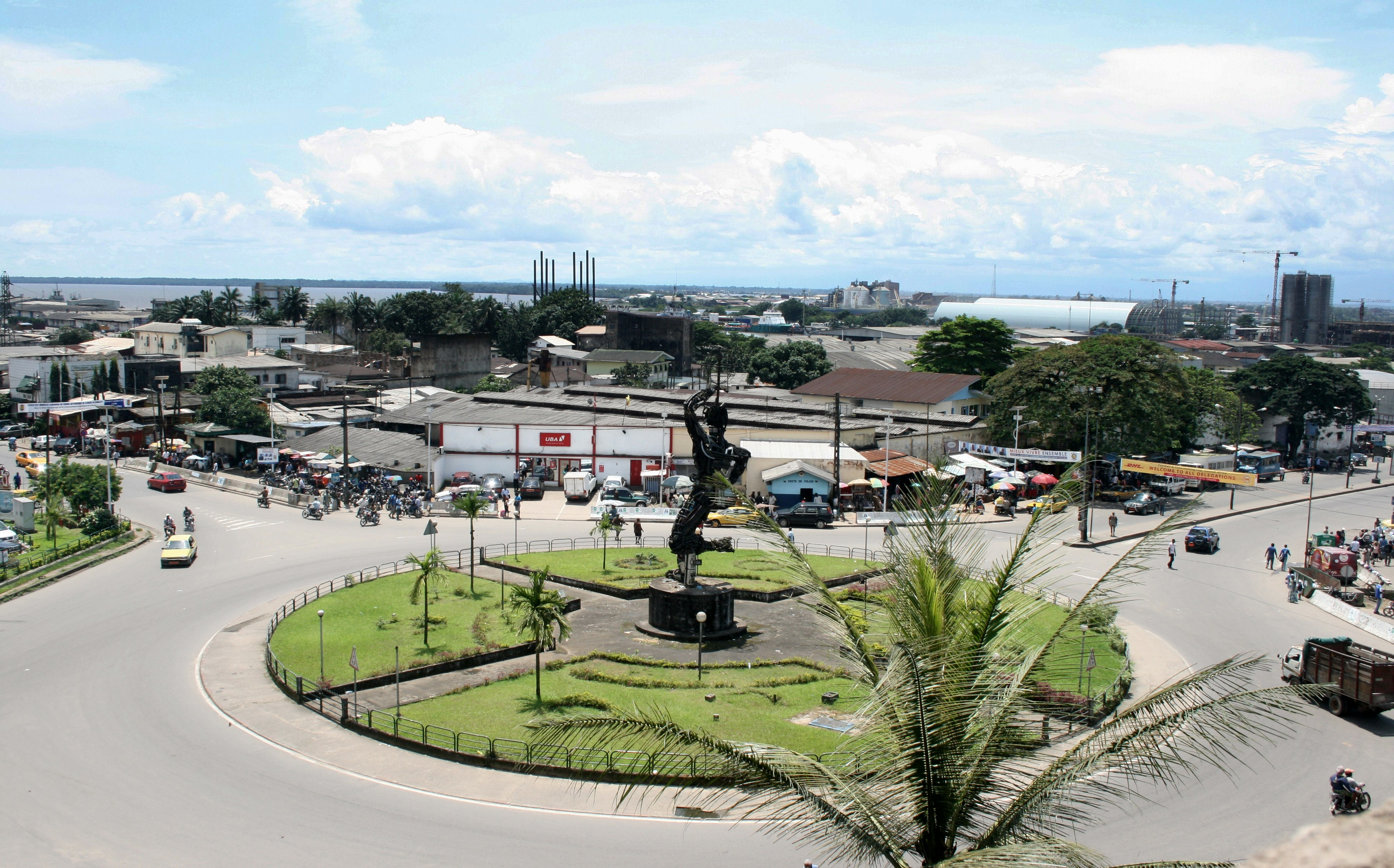

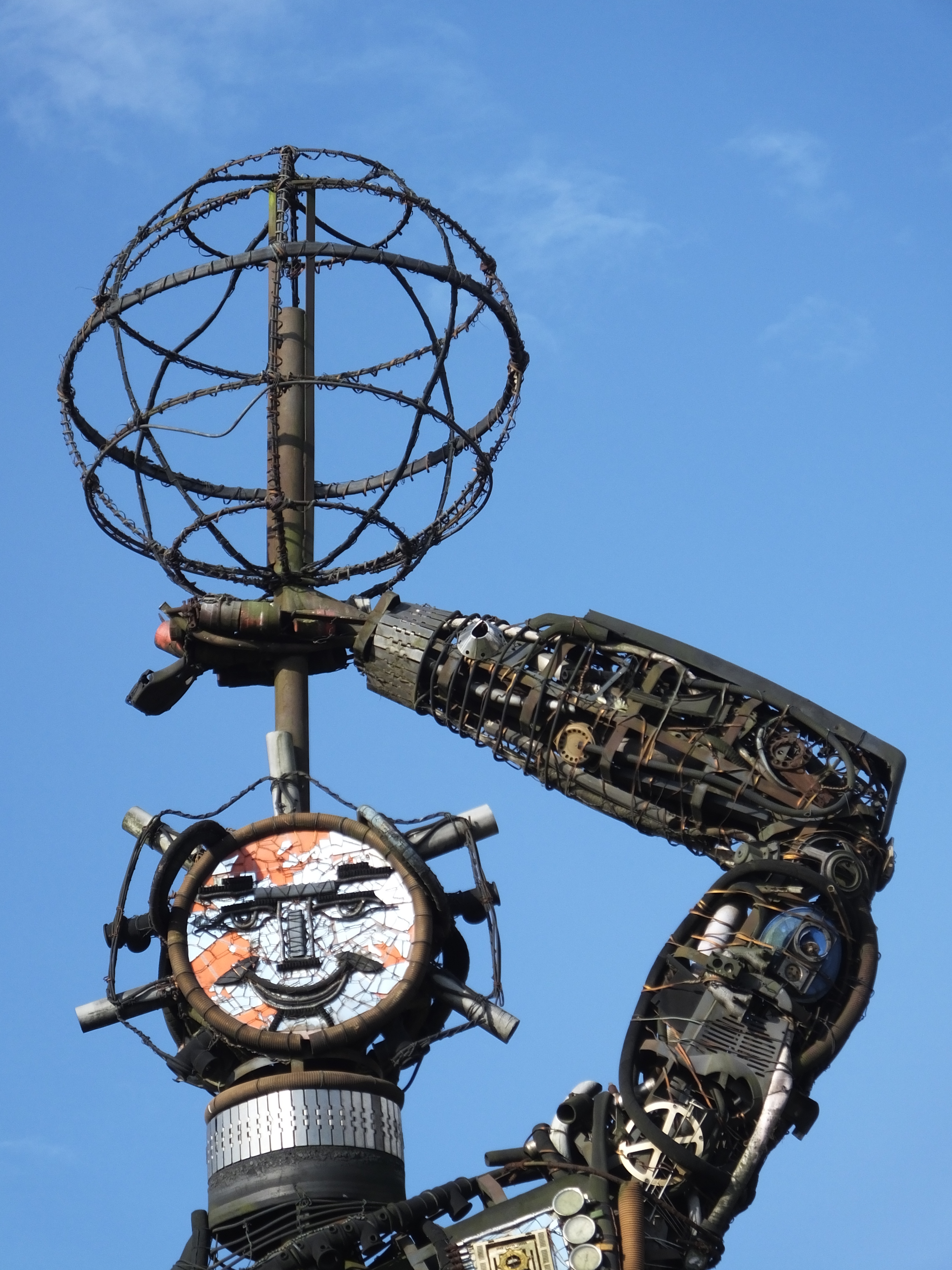

== Places of worship ==
The city's population is predominantly Christian and contains houses of worship of numerous denominations: Roman Catholic Archdiocese of Douala (Catholic Church), Evangelical Church of Cameroon (World Communion of Reformed Churches), Presbyterian Church in Cameroon (World Communion of Reformed Churches), Union of Baptist Churches in Cameroon (Baptist World Alliance), Integrity for All (Christian Missionary Fellowship and Associated Churches), Full Gospel Mission Cameroon (Assemblies of God). There are also Muslim mosques.

A small community has begun to practice Judaism in Douala, but they do not have a synagogue yet.

== Education ==
As in most large cities in Cameroon there are several nursery, primary, secondary and high schools in the city. In recent years there has been a surge in the number of private schools. It is interesting to note that there is also a large, informal educational sector that caters to a huge part of the population, mostly individuals with a primary school certificate or those with no education at all. This form of education is common in sectors like cloth manufacturing, bread making, construction, security, and car repairing. Individuals from these informal sectors are by far the most visibly deprived in neighborhoods such as Ndokoti, Bepanda, Village, Logbaba.

The city of Douala is home to a number of higher education institutions, including the University of Douala. There are also a number of professional schools, the most prominent one being the Douala Maritime institute. Douala has an aviation school called CAE Oxford Aviation Academy Douala.

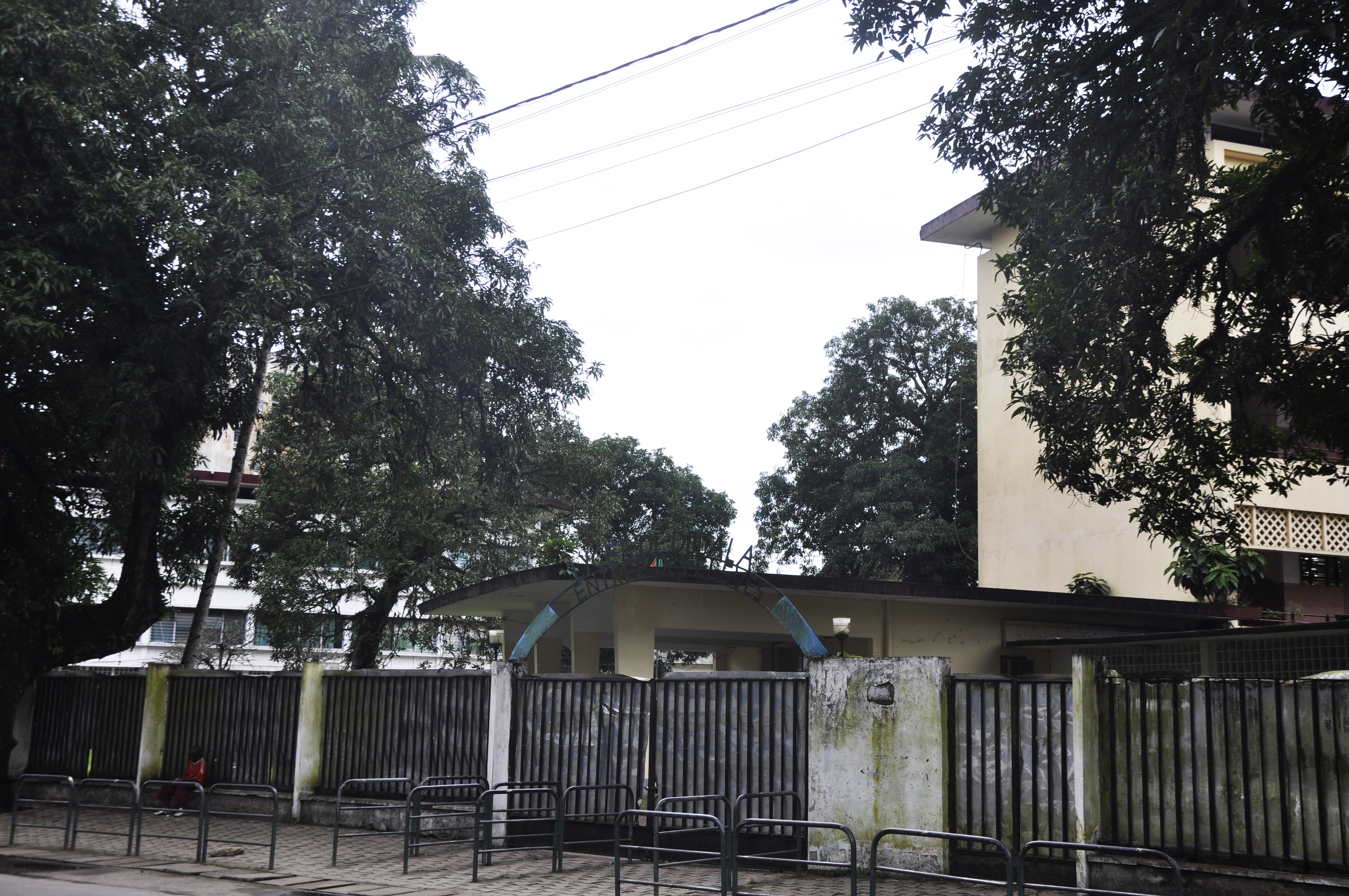
Lycée Joss Entrance

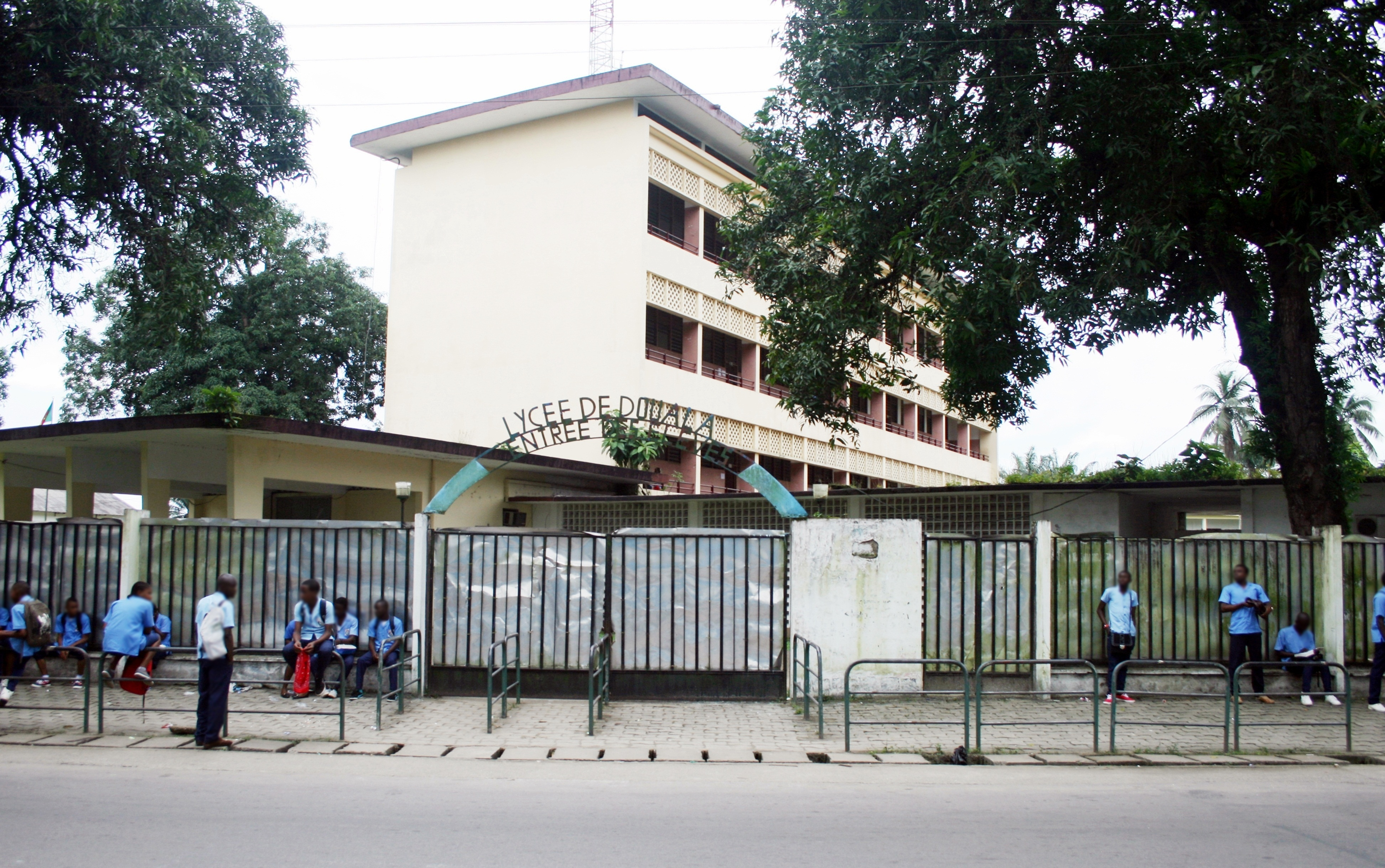
Interior of Lycée Joss

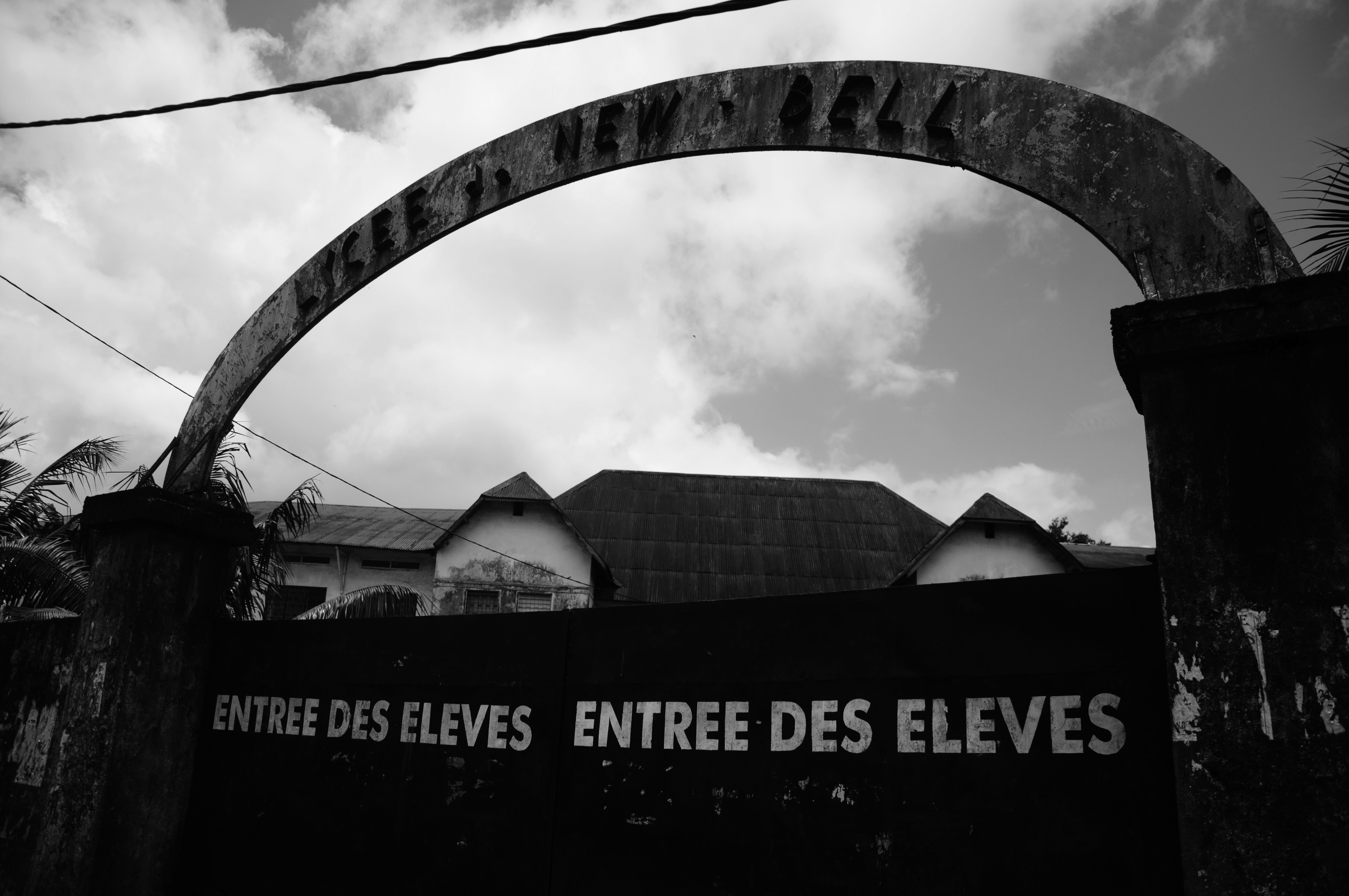
Lycée de New-Bell Entrance

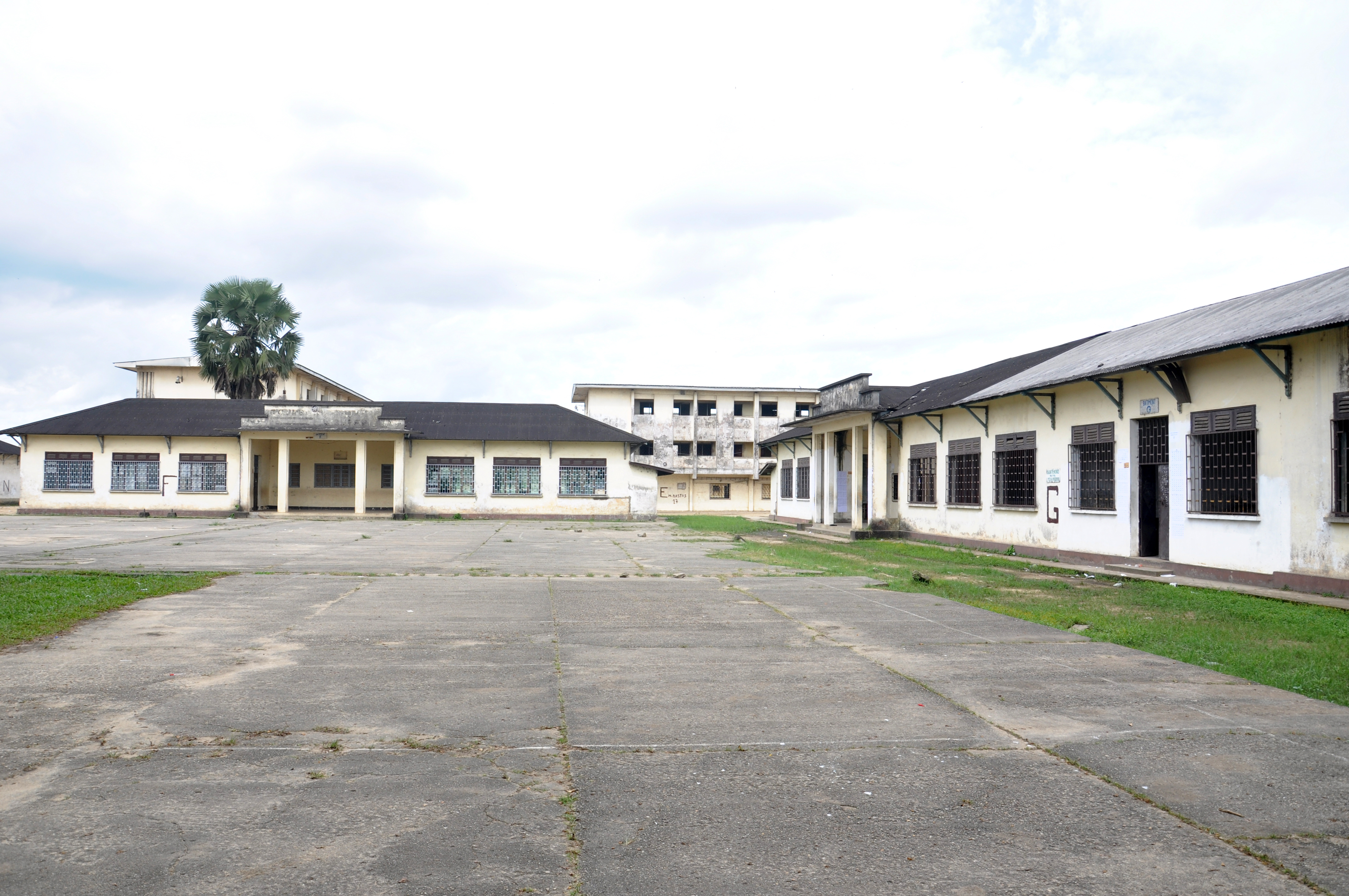
Interior of Lycée de New-Bell

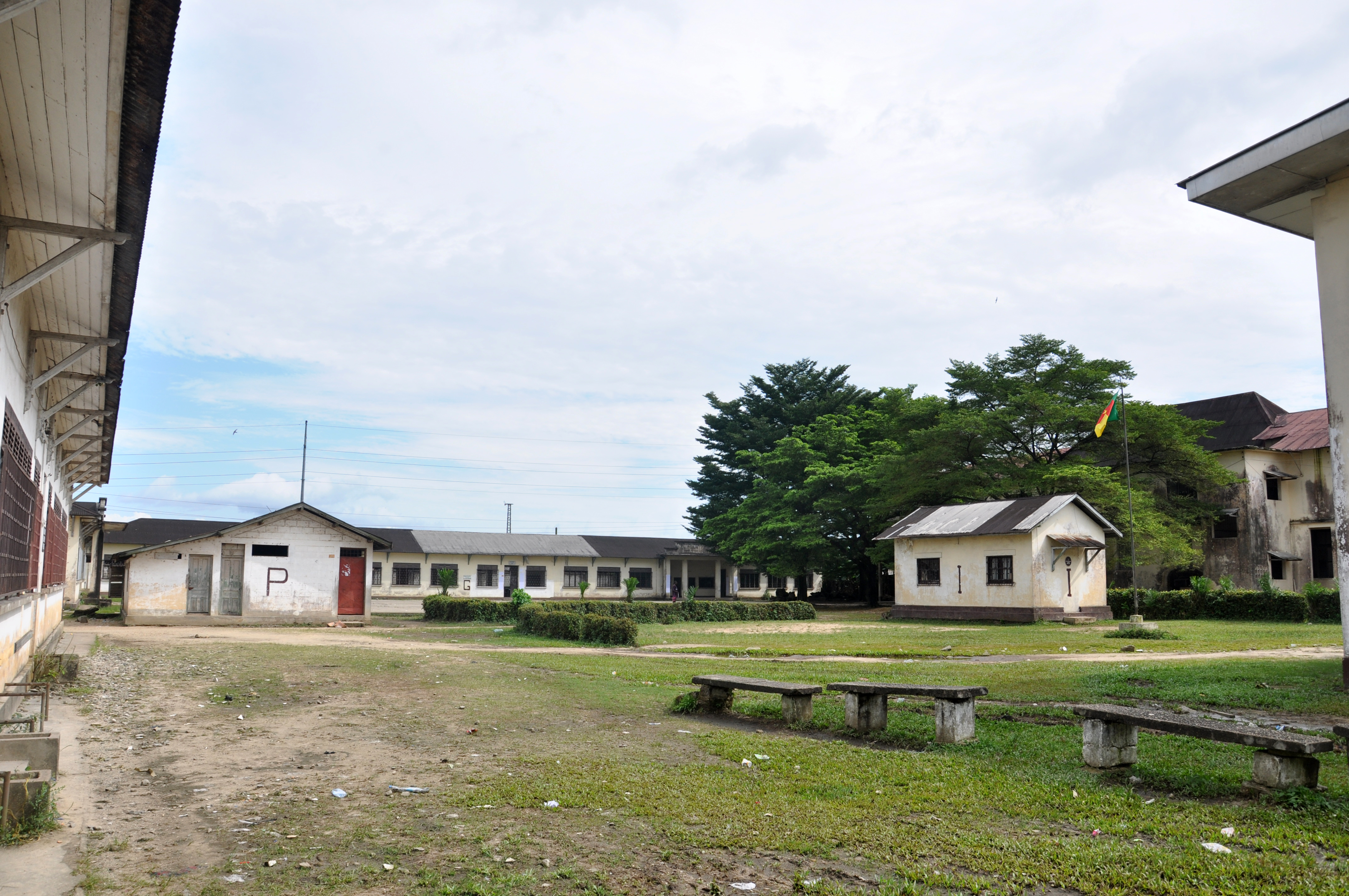
Lycée de New-Bell Classrooms

== Transportation ==
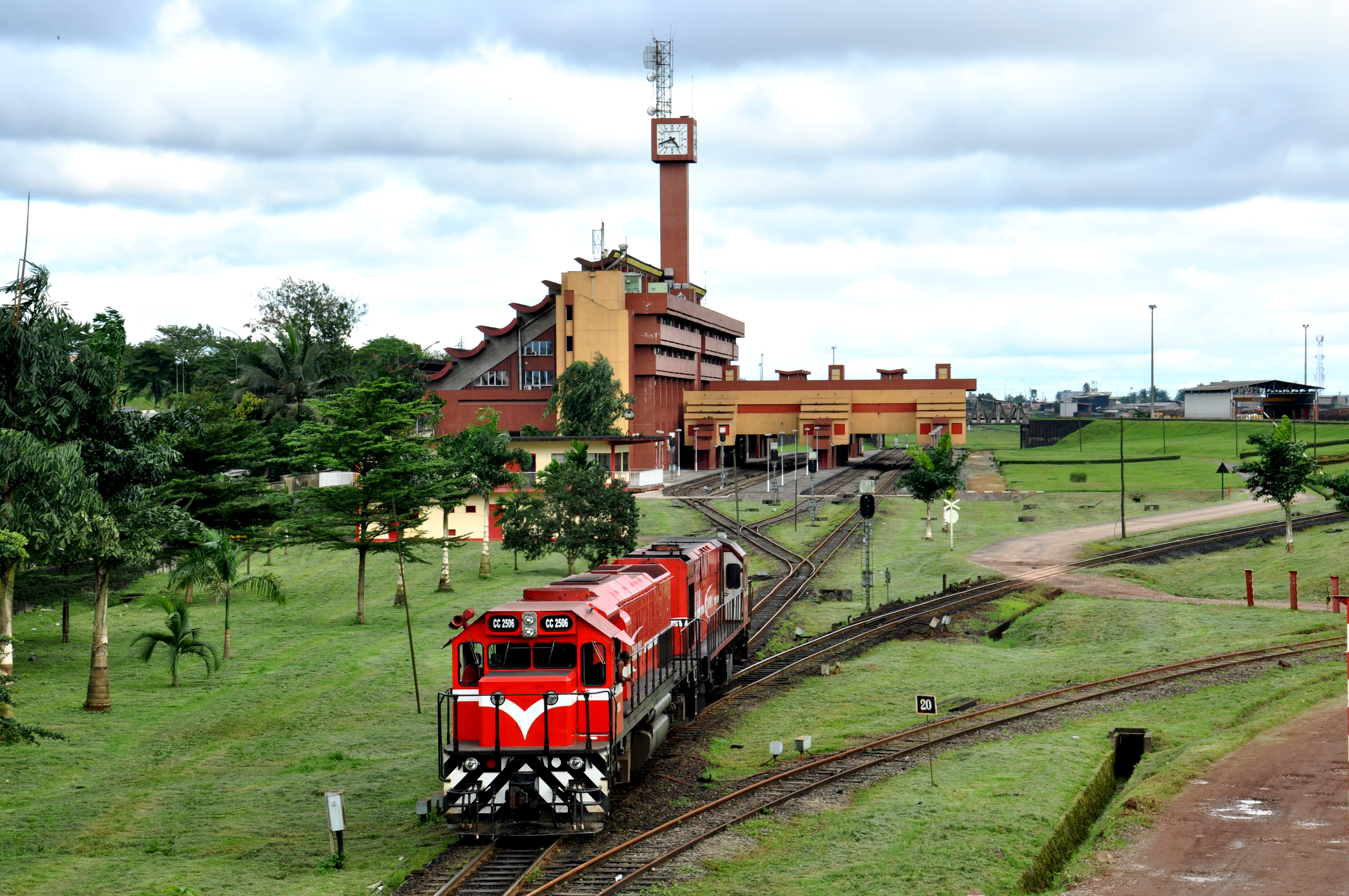
Gare de Bessengué, Douala's train station

Douala is linked by rail to Yaoundé, Ngaoundéré, Kumba and Nkongsamba. Douala has a fairly developed road network compared to other cities in Cameroon. However many of the city's roads have decayed due to years of neglect and corruption. Efforts have recently been made to renovate the city's roads, especially in the most deprived neighborhoods. In spite of the numerous domestic and international investments, the roads remain in deplorable state largely due to embezzlement and corruption.

Preceding station	Camrail	Following station
Terminus	Douala–Yaoundé	Edéa towards Yaoundé
Kumba terminus	Kumba–Douala	Terminus

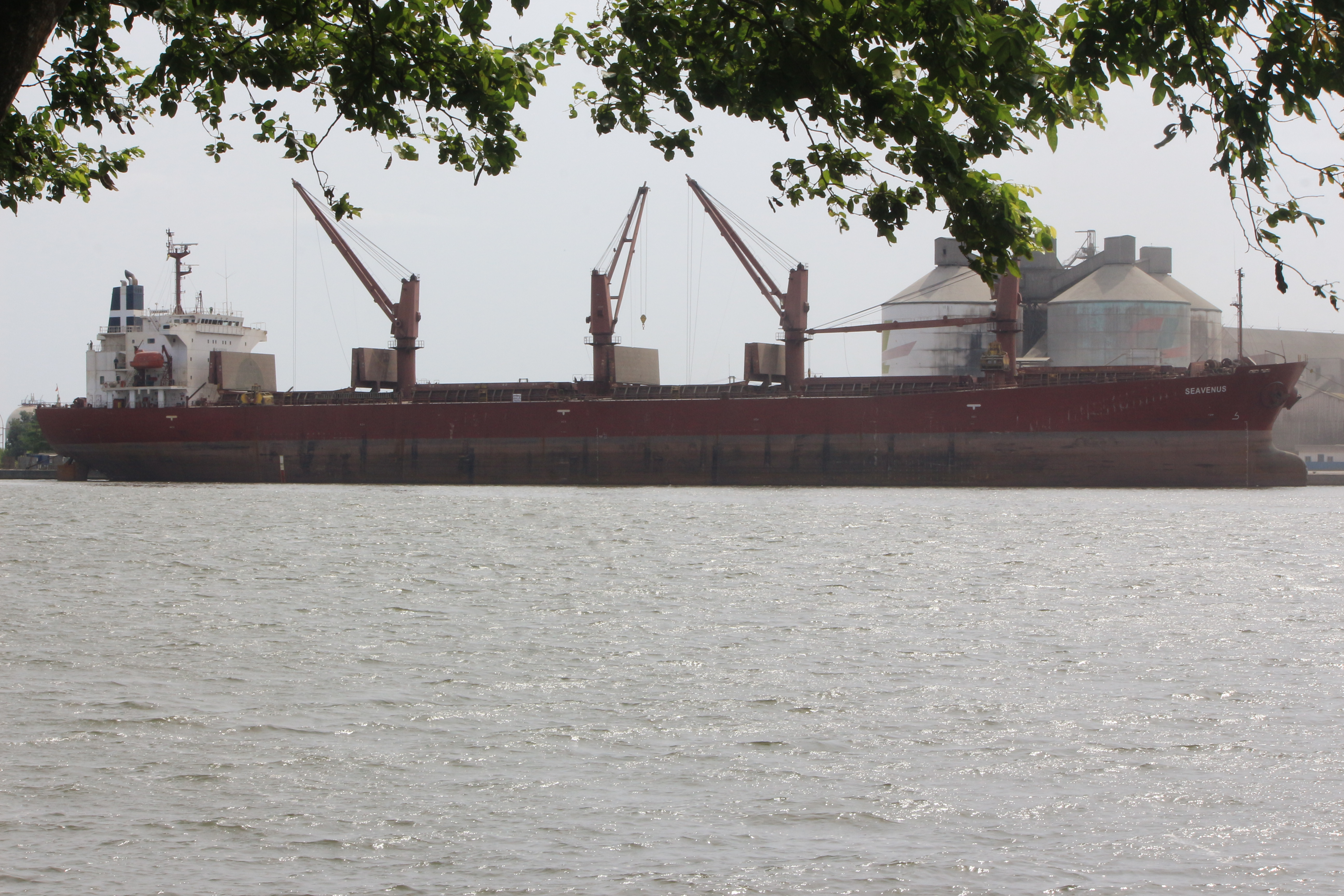
Douala seaport

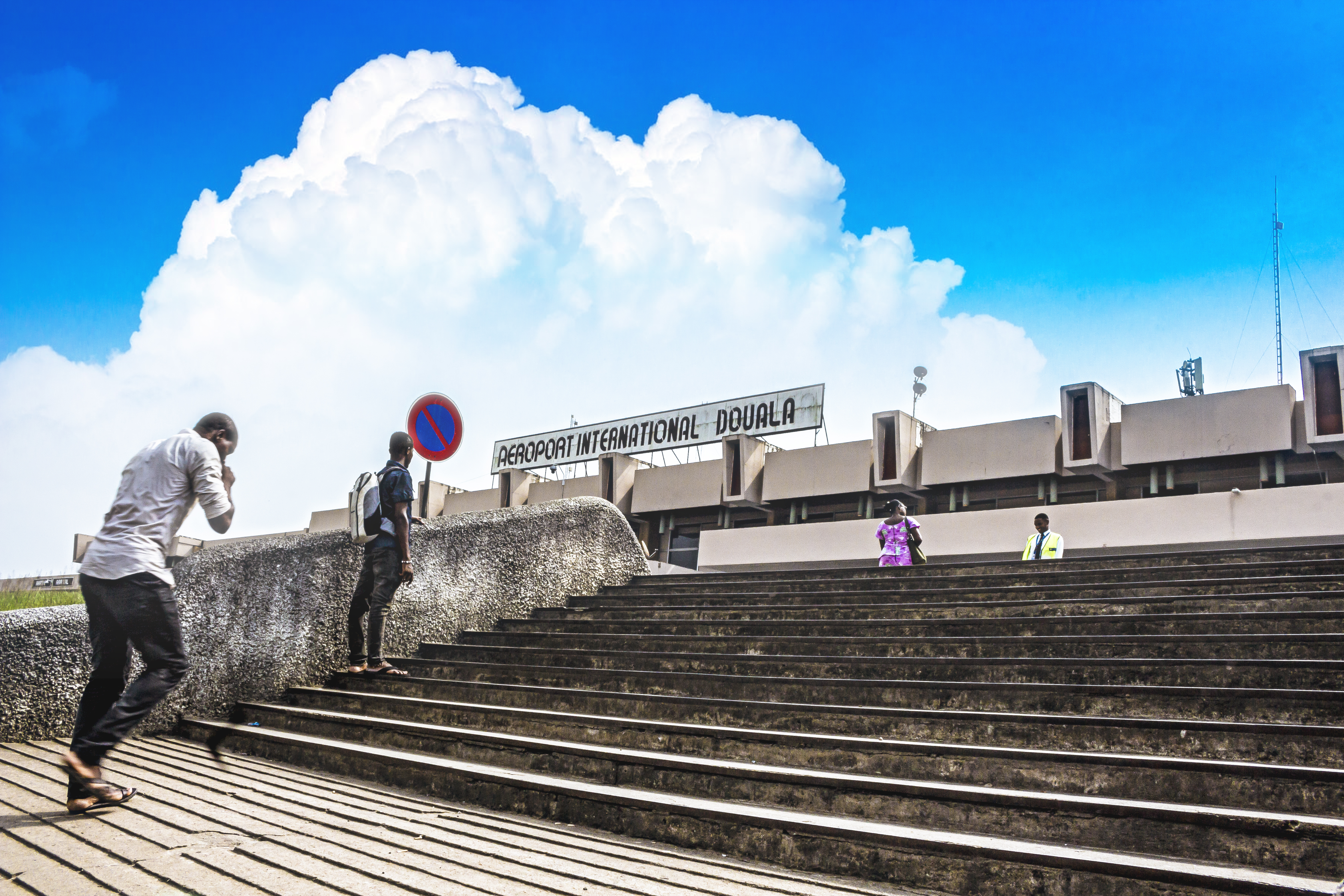
Douala International Airport

A BRT network is planned for Douala, with the first 3 lines projected to open in 2024-2025.

The Douala International Airport is located in the eastern part of the city. There are direct flights to several European cities, including Paris, Brussels, and Istanbul. Regional and continental destinations include Abidjan, Brazzaville, Dakar, Johannesburg, Kinshasa, Lagos, Malabo, and Nairobi. The airport is the busiest in the CEMAC area and is the hub for Cameroon's national carrier, Camairco. The airport is in dire need of renovations due to poor circulation and old infrastructure.

The seaport has 8.5 metres (28 feet) of draft. It is supported by the Cameroon National Ports Authority (APN) The Port of Douala is a member of the International Association of Ports and Harbors (IAPH).

== Economy ==
Douala is a city with a modest oil resource in Africa, but is in excellent agricultural condition, therefore it has one of best economies in Africa. However, like other underdeveloped countries, Douala also faces some problems such as heavy civil service and bad climate (specifically a high incidence of extreme weather events including floods, tornadoes, and storms) to business.

The main economic parameters are:

- GDP: $42.2 billion (2006 est.):
- GDP growth rate: 4.1% (2006 est.)
- Exports-partners: Spain 17.3%, Italy 13.8%, France 9.5%, South Korea 8.1%, UK 8.1%, Netherlands 7.9%, Belgium 4.9%, US 4.3% (2005)
- Imports - partners: France 21%, Nigeria 15%, Belgium 6.3%, China 5.6%, US 5.1%, Thailand 4.5%, Germany 4.2% (2005)

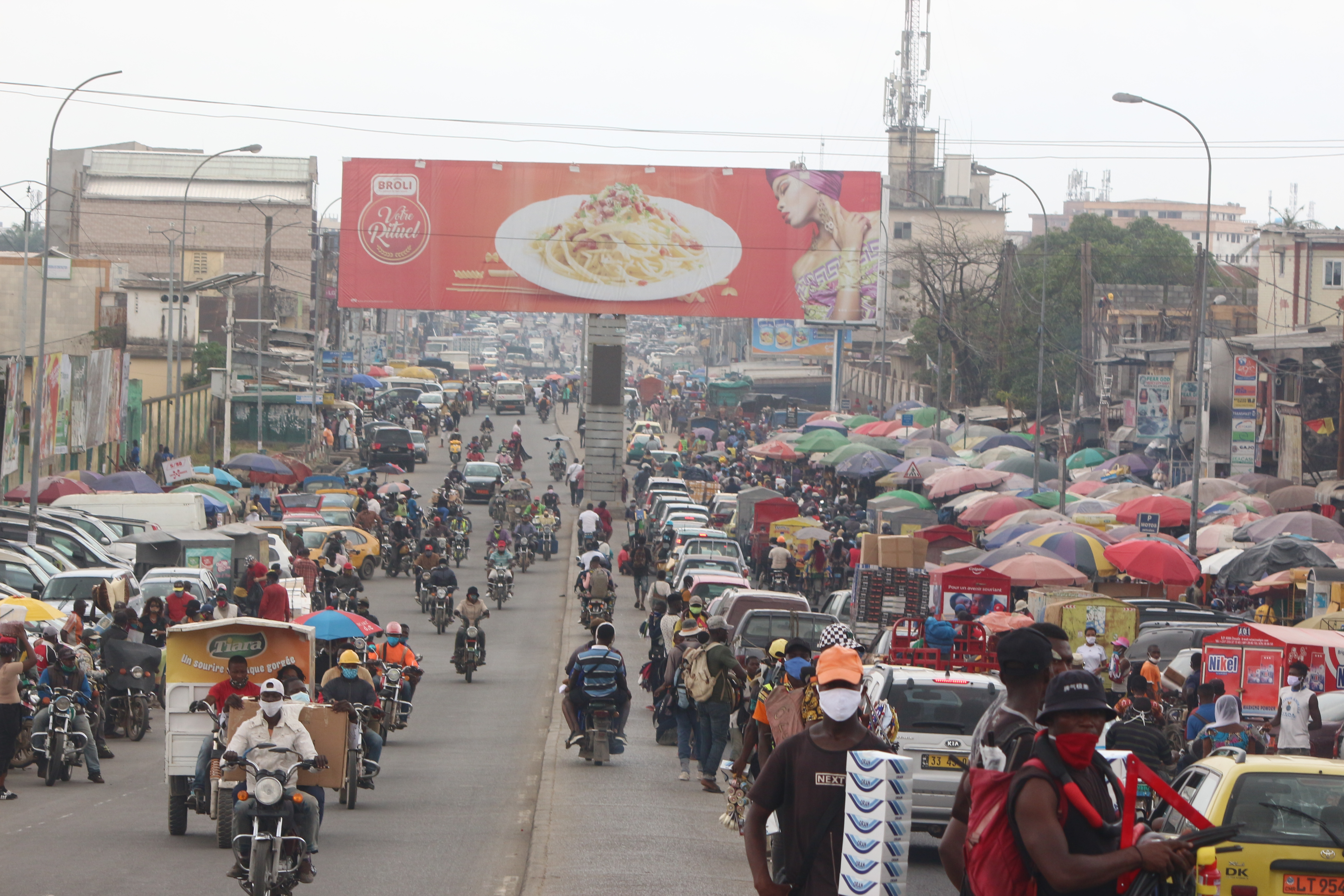
Mboppi market

=== Wealth and poverty ===
Even though Douala is the economic center of Cameroon, a large percentage of its inhabitants live below the poverty line. Recent data shows that about thirty percent of the population lives in poverty (Avameg, Inc). While the aforementioned percentage is doubled for rural regions, poverty is a growing problem for Douala due to its steadily increasing population. Unlike the rural populations of Cameroon that can grow their own foods to lessen their expenses, Douala locals are disadvantaged by living in the port city where there are not many opportunities for monetary gain.

== Notable people ==
- Ibrahim Amadou (1993–), footballer
- Frank Angong (2002–), footballer
- Patrick Baudry (1946–), second French astronaut and first astronaut from an African country
- Clément Antoine Bayema (1988–), professional Cameroonian footballer
- Francis Bebey (1929–2002), author
- BeBe Zahara Benet (1980–), drag queen
- Albert Ebossé Bodjongo (1989–2014), footballer
- Hemley Boum (1973–), writer
- Jean-Alain Boumsong (1979–), footballer
- Louis Brody (1892–1951), German actor
- Manu Dibango (1933–2020), musician, saxophonist and singer, world jazz, ethno-jazz
- Cédric Doumbé (1992–), kickboxer and mixed martial artist
- Herman Dzumafo (1980–), footballer
- Isabelle Ebanda (1936–), politician
- Angèle Etoundi Essamba (1962–), photographer
- Samuel Eto'o (1981–), footballer
- Kareyce Fotso, singer
- Roland Fomundam (1981–), software engineer and entrepreneur
- Kenny Kadji (1988–), basketball player in the Saudi Basketball League
- Alvine Kamaha, UCLA professor and physicist
- Bobby Kamwa (2000–), footballer
- Anouk Aimee Takam Kenmoe (1979–), footballer
- Christian Koloko (2000–), basketball player
- Narcisse Mouelle Kombi (1962–), writer and politician
- Maka Kotto (1961–), Canadian politician
- Guy Kouemou (1970–), inventor and aerospace engineer
- Koyo Kouoh (1967–2025), Cameroonian-Swiss art curator
- Jacques Kuoh-Moukouri (1909–2002), author and diplomat
- Thérèse Kuoh-Moukouri (1938–), feminist and author
- Véronique Mang (1984–), track athlete
- Marc Kibong Mbamba (1988–), footballer
- Delphine Medjo (1941–2016), Cameroonian politician
- Blondy Nna Noukeu (2001–), footballer
- Paul-Georges Ntep (1992–), footballer
- Yannick Nzie (1991–), footballer
- Petit Pays (1967–), singer, dancer, author
- Jean-Pierre Dikongué Pipa (1940–), cineast
- Shakiro (1997–), activist
- Pascal Siakam (1994–), basketball player, 2019 NBA Champion
- Carlos Takam (1980–), professional boxer
- Pierre Womé (1979–), footballer

== Twin towns – sister cities ==
Douala is twinned with the following places:

- Strasbourg, France
- Akhisar, Turkey
- Dakar, Senegal
- Newark, United States
- Philadelphia, United States
- Windhoek, Namibia

== See also ==
- List of colonial governors of Cameroon
- Timeline of Douala
