= Charles Atangana =

Paramount chief of the Ewondo and Bane ethnic groups

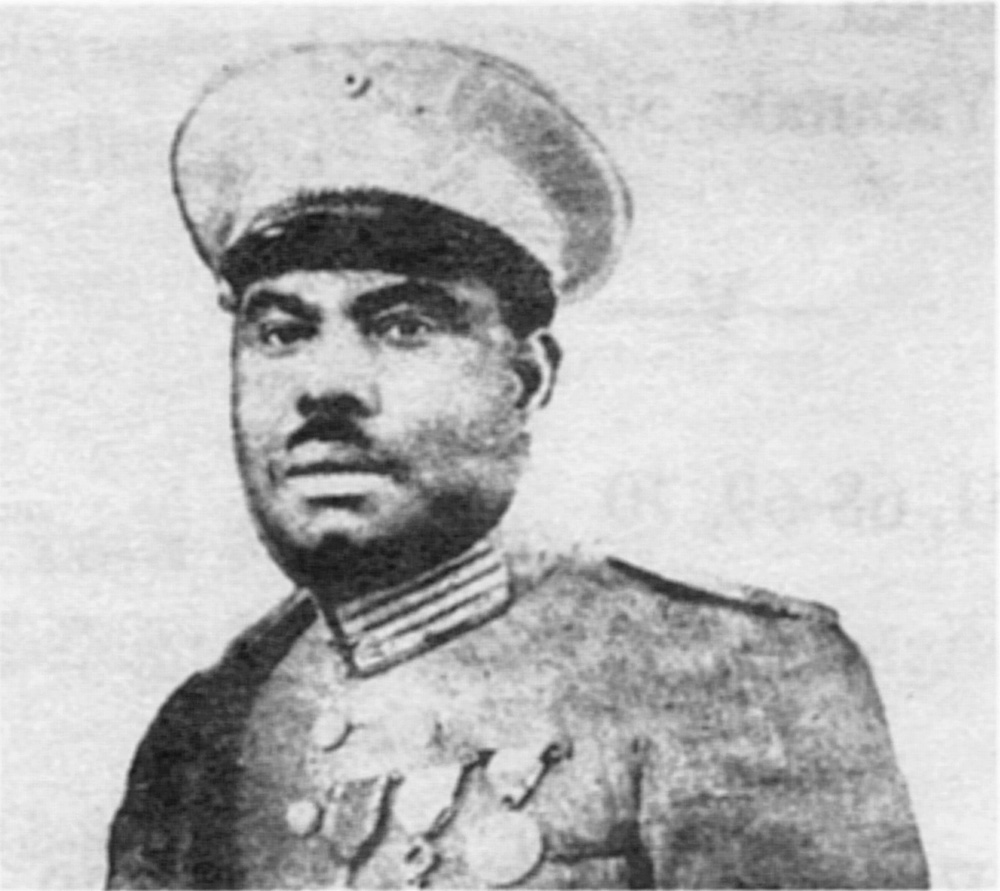

Paramount chief of the Ewondo people
- Reign: 25 March 1914 – 1 September 1943
- Predecessor: Position established
- Successor: Position abolished
- Born: Ntsama Atangana c. 1880; Mvolyé
- Died: 1 September 1943 (aged 62–63); Mvolyé, Cameroon, French Equatorial Africa

Charles Atangana (c. 1880 – 1 September 1943), also known by his birth name, Ntsama, and his German name, Karl, was the paramount chief of the Ewondo people.

== Early life ==
Atangana was born sometime between 1876 and 1885 in Mvolyé, a small village in what is today Yaoundé, Cameroon. (Note: Sources disagree on Atangana's year and place of birth. Marie-Thérèse Assiga Ahanda says that he was born circa 1883 in Yaoundé; Mark Dike DeLancey and Mark W. DeLancey write that he was born 1885 in Mvoly [sic]; Cameroonian historian Victor Julius Ngoh says that he was born circa 1882 and gives no birthplace; Paul Nde, writing for the Dictionary of African Christian Biography in 2003, claimed a birthdate of around 1876 in Ongola (an early Beti name for Yaoundé); American diplomat and academic Frederick Quinn wrote in 1980 and 1989 that he was born circa 1880, and gives no place of birth.) His parents gave him the drum name "He who is known by the nations". He was the eleventh of twelve children born to Essomba Atangana, a headman of the Mvog Atemenge sublineage of the Ewondo ethnic group. Essomba Atangana was one of thousands of minor Beti leaders living between the Sanaga and Nyong rivers, each charged with providing for his compound and the extended family and slaves who lived there. His father died when Ntsama Atangana was about six years old.

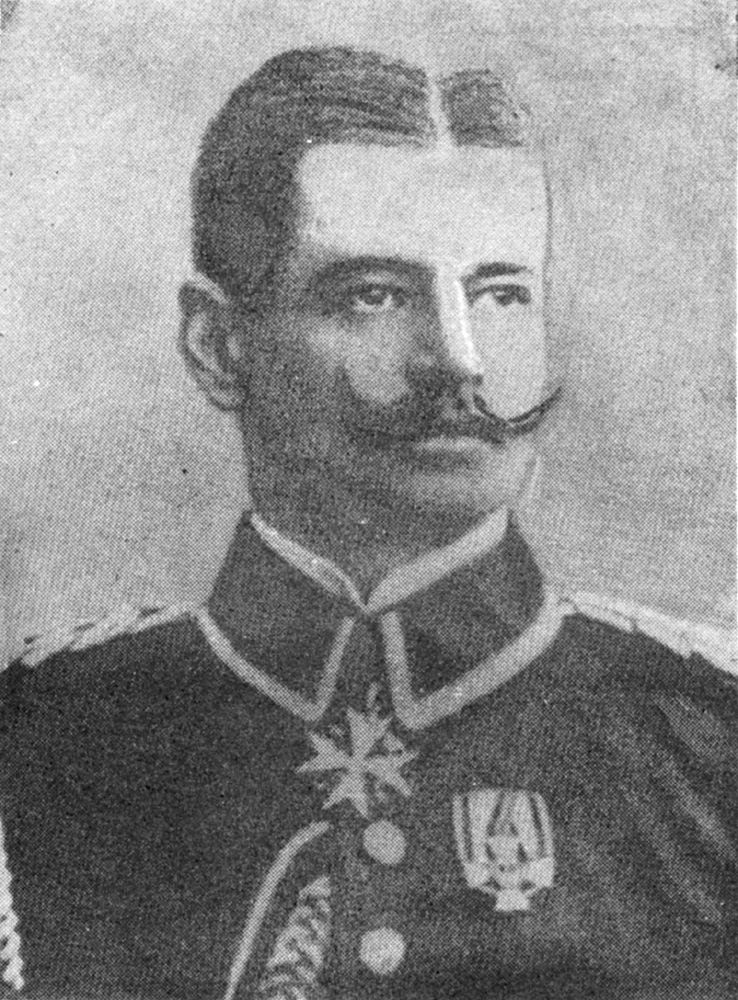
Major Hans Dominik

Little is known about Atangana's childhood. Like other Beti boys, he would have learned to fish, hunt, and trap, and would have memorised his family's genealogy and folk wisdom. Explorers from the German Empire appeared near his village in 1887 in search of a direct route to the ivory trade in the savannas to the north. They had claimed Beti lands as part of their Kamerun colony in 1884, and by February 1889 they had established a permanent base in the area, which they named Jaunde after the local people. The Ewondo opposed the foreigners at first, although Atangana was probably not yet old enough to participate in the fighting. After the defeat of Omgba Bissogo in 1895 and others like it, Ewondo resistance waned. The Germans randomly appointed chiefs and mayors to serve under them, and took local youths to perform menial tasks; Atangana was among them, sent by his uncle to be a houseboy. (Note: Ahanda indicates this occurred in 1896, but this conflicts with other sources.)

Ewondo who learned were highly favoured in the early days of the colonial regime. Station commander Hans Dominik sent four such individuals to attend the mission school of the German Pallottine Fathers in Kribi, a settlement on the coast. (Note: Quinn wrote in 1980 that this happened in 1895; Ngoh and Ahanda give 1896 as the year; while Nde indicates a year of 1897.) There, Atangana learned German language, history, and geography; mathematics; and Roman Catholicism. Father Heinrich Vieter especially liked the boy, and Atangana became the first Ewondo baptised a Roman Catholic; he took the Christian name Karl. Atangana's schooling had just ended when members of the Bulu ethnic group, one closely related to the Ewondo, invaded Kribi and sacked the school and church in 1899. Atangana waited out the revolt in Douala with the Fathers until the colonial militia defeated the rebels the following year.

== Early career ==
In August 1900, the commander of German forces at Victoria (present-day Limbe) appointed Atangana interpreter for 500 Bulu hostages, who were being pressed into labour. Atangana kept the post for six months and took up extra duties as a nurse. The colonisers next sent Atangana to Buea to work as an office clerk. At some point between the end of his schooling in Kribi and the end of his service in Victoria, Atangana met Marie Biloa, a woman from a village called Mekumba. Although she was a little older and living as a kept woman by a German functionary, Atangana married her. (Note: Ahanda says he met her in Buea, but Quinn says he met her in Kribi.) She would eventually bear him two children: Jean Ndengue and Katerina (or Catherine) Edzimbi.

Atangana was a devout Christian, and he supported the church throughout his life with land and gifts. He opposed popular Beti syncretist practices, and he was an opponent of an Ewondo initiation rite called the Sso; his efforts led to its eventual eradication from Beti society. In 1901 he secured land for the Pallottine Fathers to build a mission in Jaunde, thus opening east and south Cameroon to Catholic proselytisation. Nevertheless, Atangana supported traditional Ewondo customs on marriage. On widows, he said,

My colleagues and I . . . can only reply in demanding the upholding of custom, which requires the widow to be the property of the heir until her liberation, which can only take effect after the return of her bridewealth. She must remain with him as long as this return is not made.

Early in 1902, the colonial government appointed him their representative to the Ewondo people, and interpreter and clerk for the Germans posted in Jaunde. He was tasked with organising a census and tax collection system. He chose 300 headmen to be tax collectors, of whom the Germans approved 233. Atangana negotiated a cut of 5% for the collectors, much to their delight.

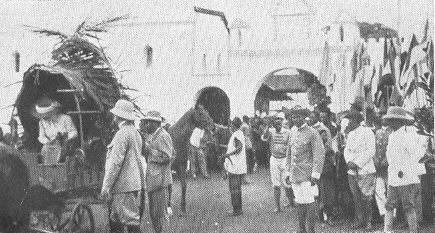
Atangana (foreground, right side) during the German colonial period

Hans Dominik became the Jaunde post commander in 1904. For the next six years, Atangana accompanied him on at least fifteen administrative patrols and probative excursions. Atangana proved an astute diplomat, in one case negotiating with a group of rebellious Manguissa and thus averting a confrontation between the tribesmen and the Germans. Atangana helped open posts in such wide-ranging places as Bafia, Abong-Mbang, Mouloudou, Ngaoundéré, Garoua, and Maroua. The Germans largely kept themselves segregated from their African subjects, but Dominik and Atangana defied these standards and grew close, even dining together in the same tent on occasion. Back in Jaunde, Atangana gained responsibilities valued by the regime, such as overseeing a poll tax in October 1908.

In 1907, members of the Mvog Ada sublineage revolted against the colonial government over Atangana's appointment as their official interpreter. The plot included a conspiracy to poison Atangana, but word leaked to him. He informed his masters, and on 11 April, six plotters were put to death and two others imprisoned.

Dominik died on 16 November 1910. That same year, Atangana returned to Jaunde and received an administrative post, perhaps as head of the Ewondo-Bane court, which presided over civil disputes and small claims and was the conduit through which the Germans transmitted communiqués (and gauged the response to them). (Note: Ahanda and Nde say he was made paramount chief of the Ewondo and Bane at this time. However, Quinn wrote in 1989 that he was given a court appointment. In 1980, Quinn placed the court appointment in 1913 or later.) However, he resigned the post when the head of his sublineage died; Atangana took over as headman of the sublineage and Mvolyé village.

In late 1911, Atangana voyaged to Germany to teach Ewondo at the Colonial Institute of the University of Hamburg. He stayed there for about one year and transcribed Ewondo history and folklore for translation into German. His writings eventually became the Jaunde-Texte, an important source document on Ewondo history and culture. In 1913, he met Emperor Wilhelm II in Germany and Pope Pius X in Rome. He returned to Cameroon the following year.

== Paramount chief ==
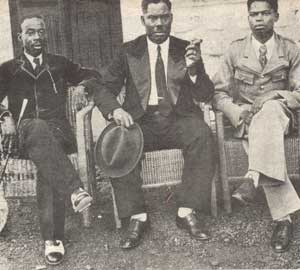
Atangana as paramount chief

The Germans had seen some success in uniting disparate groups under single individuals called paramount chiefs (German: Oberhäuptlinge). Atangana was chosen for this position among the Ewondo and Bane either before his trip to Germany or soon after. (Note: Ahanda and Nde place Atangana's selection as paramount chief of the Ewondo and Bane as 1911; Quinn repeatedly writes that Atangana became paramount chief on 25 March 1914.) This was technically only a temporary appointment; his subjects would have to approve it a year later to make it permanent. They had little alternative; Atangana was already the primary conduit of information to and from the Germans.

Some emulation of European manners and dress was expected of all chiefs, but Atangana seems to have genuinely preferred European styles to African ones. He endeavoured to fit himself into the German mould of an ideal administrator. He wrote, "To dare to approach the Germans it is necessary to abandon the traits which displease them, to become their friend and then be valued by them." Accordingly, Atangana ate German food; formed a European-style, 20-piece orchestra; and ordered a large, Germanic mansion to be built. This latter project requiring construction of a brickyard and sawmill and earned Atangana another epithet, Mindili Ebulu, "the man whose house is so large that it had a roof divided into nine sections instead of the two sections of an ordinary dwelling." The number nine has great significance in Beti folklore.

Atangana was suspicious of anyone who might supplant him as the Germans' favourite. He wrote,

A number of persons who associated themselves with Europeans and proved themselves useful to white people achieved positions in the native society through fraud and extortion. But the Europeans, having noticed it, stopped it. They could discern natives of the noble class by their loyalty and honesty.

Atangana won over other chiefs and headmen through gifts, tax cuts, flattery, and intervention on their behalf. He lavished attention on visitors from out of town, letting them stay at his palace and use his horses, and treating them to feasts. In addition to flattering them, this allowed him to monitor their activities and dealings with the colonial authorities. His clerk appointees in Jaunde informed him of the doings of both the Germans and his subjects. Atangana gained a substantial amount of wealth. He owned workshops and sold produce from five plantations to provision impressed railway construction workers.

The paramount chief maintained some loyalty for his subjects. He persuaded the Germans to carry out infrastructure improvements such as the building of roads, schools, health clinics, and churches; and he defended his subjects from colonial reprisals. In one instance, an Ewondo interpreter fired a gun during a dispute with a German, an offence punishable with a stiff prison sentence. Atangana interceded, and the man's punishment was reduced to porter duty. However, the paramount chief remained completely loyal to the governors. In 1914, for example, representatives of Duala leader Rudolf Duala Manga Bell tried to secure Atangana's backing for a pan-Cameroonian revolt. Atangana kept the plot under wraps, but he instructed the envoy to urge Manga Bell to reconsider.

Atangana's appointment irritated members of the Bulu ethnic group. They feared they might one day lose German favour, or worse yet, fall under the dominion of the Ewondo. This culminated in the 1912 Bulu uprising led by Martin-Paul Samba, a German-trained man much like Atangana. The rebellion was crushed and Samba executed.

== World War I ==
The Allied West African Campaign of World War I reached Cameroon in 1914. Douala fell on 17 September, and the Germans regrouped at Jaunde. Beti informants alerted Atangana as to the Allies' progress, and as the loss of Jaunde seemed inevitable, Atangana prepared to escape with his masters. He and the chiefs under him gave their posts to weaker relatives so they could more easily take them back should the Germans return. They held out in Jaunde until 1 January 1916, when troops of the British Army captured the town, and the German soldiers and missionaries fled into the forest. Atangana and 72 Ewondo and Bane chiefs, along with 14–20,000 villagers (mostly soldiers and their families), led them through. A Beti folk song, "Atangana Ntsama, the War Is Over", tells of the retreat and shows the conflict between those Beti who supported Atangana and those who opposed him:

Atangana Ntsama, the war is over . . .
Hè! Atangana Ntsama, the war is over!
The cannon are broken,
Go tell it to the son of Ndono Edoa,
To the great man who is the son of Ndono Edoa,
Run quickly, why do you languish there?
All you Ewondo, come and run quickly,
Come and run quickly, brothers;
Go tell it to Mindili Ebulu, son of Ndono Edoa.
How is it that you would like me to leave so many goods behind?
Hè! They will surprise you in your greed!
Such richness. I should take some!
You others, move off, what are you doing there?
Friend, there were as many goods as in a market;
Friend, we have marched through all of that without taking anything!

They reached Spanish Guinea in February and surrendered to the unaligned representatives of Spain. The Spanish government of Álvaro Figueroa Torres gave the Beti land to settle and agreed to transport the Germans to the nearby island of Fernando Po. Atangana and members of his family accompanied them. In 1918, the Germans sent Atangana and six other chiefs to Spain, where they would witness if necessary that the Germans had treated their African subjects humanely. In September 1919, Atangana had an audience with King Alfonso XIII of Spain and urged him to support the Germans in these proceedings. Atangana remained in Madrid for two years and stayed a month in Barcelona to retrieve money he had deposited through the Basel Mission.

Meanwhile, Ewondo lands came under the administration of the French Third Republic under a League of Nations mandate. Atangana, now known by the French version of his name, Charles, wrote the French government to swear his allegiance and demand readmittance to his homeland. He received his wish in June 1920 and arrived in Douala on 28 November 1920.

== Later life ==
Atangana's unfailing loyalty and subservience to Germany prevented the French from ever fully trusting him. His first task under the new colonial regime was to supervise gangs of forced road-construction labourers in the town of Dschang. In Atangana's absence, the French had appointed a Beti headman named Joseph Atemengue as their local representative in Jaunde (now known by the French spelling, Yaoundé). However, Atemengue never enjoyed the popularity Atangana had among the Beti. Atangana tried to secure an alliance with him by sending his 20-year-old, German-educated daughter, Katerina, to marry him, but she eventually fled from the much older Atemengue and back to her father. Atangana's work performance convinced the French to let him return to Yaoundé in late 1921 or early 1922. (Note: Ahanda says 26 November, but Quinn says December.)

Soon thereafter, Atemengue was made chief of the local court, and Atangana was again appointed paramount chief (French: chef supérieur). (Note: Ahanda places these events in early 1922, but Quinn wrote in 1980 that they occurred in December 1921.) He received a seat on the Council of Notables, a body the French had introduced to act as liaisons to their subjects and advisors to the administration. Atangana set up a cabinet based on those he had observed in Spain, but he never allowed it to do much, and its members were not accustomed to European-style administration. It disbanded in 1925.

The French granted the chiefs significantly less power than had their German predecessors. Atangana's major role was simple: to enforce the dictats of French rule. Governor General Van Vollenhoven wrote in 1917 that, "the chiefs have no power of their own of any kind because there are not two authorities in the circle: French authority and indigenous authority; there is only one. Only the commander of the circle commands." As a colonial administrator, Atangana was expected to collect taxes, help the French introduce cocoa and coffee plantations, and mobilise chiefs to secure the labour to work these estates. In 1924, the French introduced a requisition system to procure food for the Yaoundé urban community and for rail labourers; Atangana was responsible for rallying the chiefs to gather the necessary provisions from rural farmers; the exact methods used by the chiefs was left to them. Cocoa production in the South and Centre provinces increased even during the Great Depression, partially as a result of these efforts. He reorganised the chiefs and their duties and tried to Westernise his subjects by encouraging them to wear European-style clothing, use new building methods and house styles, and work to improve roads.

Most of the chiefs respected Atangana as their spokesman and leader, and the Beti at large deferred to him prestige and power. A new system of status had evolved under his rule: a cadre of minor bureaucrats, envoys, interpreters, and office staff worked for Atangana and the other chiefs independent of the French government and were completely dependent on the chiefs. Atangana set up a private police force, for example, known as the fulus in Ewondo. The entire class recognised its reliance on the chiefs and gave them loyalty in exchange for protection and pay, and the chiefs relied on these functionaries to swiftly fulfill their duties to the French regime.

Nevertheless, the Beti at large detested French forced labour practices and taxes. Some people fled to the bush before the tax collector arrived; others circumvented taxes by counting wives as out-of-town visitors or waiting until the last minute to pay and thus reducing the collector's cut of the tax money. If the taxes were not collected to the satisfaction of the colonial administrators, Atangana himself was expected to make up some of the difference. To counter these minor rebellions, chiefs could punish their subjects with 15 days in jail or 100 franc fines without due process of law. This was meant to be reserved for only certain infractions, but Atangana and other chiefs interpreted it broadly to include all sorts of difficult behaviour. Atangana and his sub-chiefs were expected to discipline such difficult subjects. He exerted continual pressure on the sub-chiefs, who in turn placed constant pressure on the villagers to pay taxes and supply labourers.

Nevertheless, his wealth continued to grow. In 1922, his salary was 6,000 francs per year, and in 1938, it had risen to 24,000 francs per year. Atangana also received 2% of all taxes collected by lower chiefs, pay for his legal role, and stipends for organising road construction. Oral informants have reported that as early as 1924, he owned enormous plantations with as much as 1 km^{2} of cocoa, 1.1 km^{2} of palms, 5 km^{2} of food crops, and 500 head of livestock. The amounts may be exaggerated, but Atangana was by all accounts a wealthy man. According to British historian John Iliffe, he had five square kilometres of oil palms and a square kilometre of cocoa trees at this time. He owned two lorries and a car by 1926, which he used to haul produce from his plantations. By the 1930s, important chiefs such as Atangana could earn more than 400,000 francs per year on tax collecting alone.

The 278 Beti chiefs under Atangana's control began to oppose his primacy by the mid-1920s. His control fell especially among the Bane. In 1924, the Bane filed a complaint against Atangana in court, claiming, "We work always and it is Atangana who receives the money. For all the things that we have sent to the Europeans, such as chickens and eggs, through Atangana, we have received nothing." They plotted to raise their own paramount chief and to drum up sentiment against Atangana among the common people. The French arrested the plotters for refusing to pay their taxes and provide labourers. This left Atangana still head of the Bane, but his influence had been severely curtailed.

In 1925, the French reduced the number of Beti chiefs to 40 and removed the chiefs of Yaoundé from Atangana's direct control. However, in 1928 the Yaoundé chiefs were deemed quarrelsome and incompetent, and Atangana was once again placed over them. In 1929, he wrote a work on traditional Beti society in which he tried to hide his unremarkable childhood by taking the title of "King" and claiming descent from a fictitious line of Ewondo royalty. By the end of the decade, he was the head of perhaps 130,000 people, the chief of Mvolyé village, and the supervisor of eight sectional chiefs and 72 village chiefs. In reality, his position was one of prestige but little actual power.

Collecting taxes and finding labour grew increasingly difficult as the decade progressed, thanks to greater access to paying employment in Yaoundé and on the plantations. Atangana's 1938 proposal for the reorganisation of Yaoundé's administration shows the frustration he experienced at that time:

the local people do not know what endurance means . . . [and] work with ill-will for the administration or for private concerns, where they seek refuge as a safeguard when the administration gives the chiefs an order in the public interest or for their own good.

He further complained, "Notables, with their diminished influence, are almost inert in relation to the growing number of their recalcitrant subjects" and suggested that a chief could hardly control more than 5,000 people. Atangana is not even mentioned in a French report on their African leaders from 1939. However, he retained the right to announce the appointment of new chiefs and to claim that both he and the French had selected them.

Atangana travelled frequently in the French colonial period. He made a point of attending his subjects' weddings and funerals, for example. He had more opportunities to visit Europe, including the Paris Colonial Exposition in 1931 and the French Colonial Conference in 1935. In 1938, his wife died. Atangana was a handsome man by Ewondo standards: strong, well groomed, with a reputation as a good fighter, dancer, and husband. He remarried on 6 January 1940 to Julienne or Yuliana Ngonoa, a young Beti woman of the Mvog Manga sublineage from the village Nkolafamba. They had two children: Marie-Thérèse and René Grégoire. Atangana seems to have adhered to Catholic strictures against polygamy, despite the fact that other Beti chiefs at the time had several hundred wives.

Atangana lobbied in his later life for public health causes, such as the eradication of sleeping sickness. He never supported the expansion of Cameroon's public school system, since he believed that educated subjects might one day challenge his rule. Atangana's health began to fail him beginning in August 1943. On 1 September, he died in Mvolyé, Yaoundé.

== Legacy ==
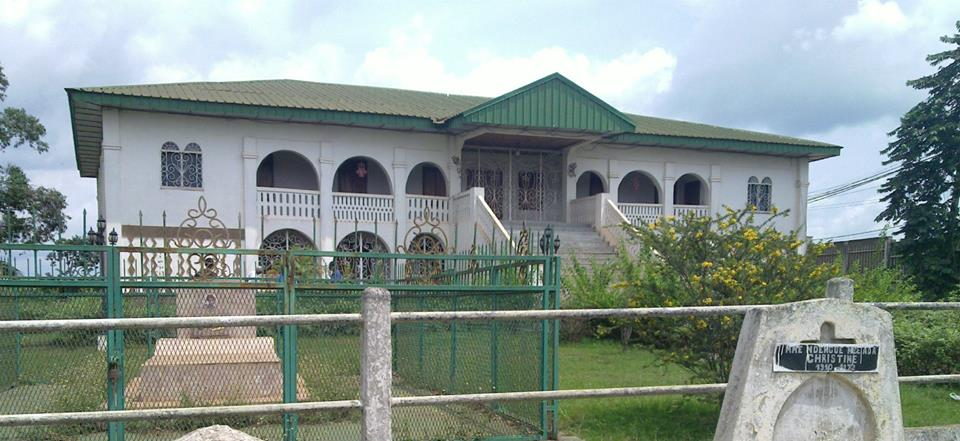
Atangana's restored palace at Éfoulan in 2023.

No one took over as paramount chief upon Atangana's death. His opulent palace went unoccupied and fell into ruins. However, traditional Cameroonian chieftaincies were re-established on 11 July 1977 by Decree #77/609, and by the 1990s, Cameroonian ethnic groups had rejuvenated these dormant traditions. Atangana's daughter Marie-Thérèse became the new Ewondo paramount chief. In December 2000, she began the renovation of his palace at Efoulan, Yaoundé, a project that would cost an estimated 150,000,000 CFA francs.

The colonialism that Atangana supported has been claimed to have had a negative effect upon Cameroon's economic development. Production centred on enriching the chiefs, wooing of foreign investment, and the apparatus of colonial administration, and building only that infrastructure that would aid in the transport and export of cash crops. Nevertheless, Atangana's story became part of Beti folklore. For example, Beti storytellers related his tale in oral poems and songs that took up to a full night to recite. His legacy was largely forgotten by the nation at large between his death and Cameroonian independence. However, the nationalist scholarship that blossomed after Cameroon's independence in 1960 resurrected his story. Charles Atangana Avenue in downtown Yaoundé is named for him. A statue in his likeness tops a hill nearby, which had fallen into disrepair by 2000.
