= SSO =

SSO may refer to:

== Organizations ==
- Sarasota County Sheriff's Office, a law enforcement agency in Sarasota County, Florida, US
- Social Security Organization, a social welfare organization in Iran
- Special Security Office, a function to disseminate sensitive information in the US federal government and armed forces
- Special Security Organization, a former Iraqi security agency
- Special Source Operations, a division of the US National Security Agency that collects digital data
- Standards Setting Organization, a group developing, producing or maintaining technical standards
- SSO VS, Russian Special Operations Forces (Sily Spetsial'nykh Operatsiy)
- SSO ZSU, Ukrainian Special Operations Forces (Syly Spetsialʹnykh Operatsiy)
- SSO, Belarusian Special Operations Forces

=== Orchestras ===
- Salford Symphony Orchestra, England
- Saskatoon Symphony Orchestra, Canada
- Scottish Symphony Orchestra, Scotland
- Seattle Symphony Orchestra, US
- Shreveport Symphony Orchestra, US
- Singapore Symphony Orchestra, Singapore
- Southern Syncopated Orchestra, an early US jazz group that toured the UK and Ireland 1919–21
- Springfield Symphony Orchestra, US
- Stavanger Symphony Orchestra, Norway
- Sudbury Symphony Orchestra, Canada
- Sydney Symphony Orchestra, Australia
- Syracuse Symphony Orchestra, US

== Arts and entertainment ==
- Starship Operators, a Japanese sci-fi novel and anime television series
- Super Surgical Operation, a Japanese video game also known as Trauma Center: Under the Knife

== Science and technology ==
=== Spaceflight ===
- Scaled Composites SpaceShipOne, the vehicle used in the first privately funded human spaceflight
- Semi-synchronous orbit, a type of orbit
- Single-stage-to-orbit, a reusable vehicle that reaches space without jettisoning hardware
- Space Shuttle Orbiter, a reusable space vehicle formerly operated by NASA
- Sun-synchronous orbit, a type of orbit
- Swiss Space Office, national space program of Switzerland

=== Computing ===
- Single sign-on, allowing access to multiple software systems using one login
- Structure, sequence and organization, a US legal term relating to computer programs and copyright

=== Electronics ===
- Simultaneous switching output, also known as simultaneous switching noise (SSN), or ground bounce

=== Astronomy ===
- Siding Spring Observatory, an astronomical observatory in Australia

== Other uses ==
- Sanitary sewer overflow, when untreated sewage is discharged into the environment
- Senior station officer (New Zealand Fire Service), a rank in the New Zealand Fire Service
- Source-separated organics, a system for separating compostable materials from other waste streams
- Student Switch Off, a UK-based energy saving campaign
- Sydney Star Observer, an LGBT newspaper in Sydney, Australia
- South Sudan Oyee!, the national anthem of South Sudan.
- Subsynchronous oscillations in an electrical grid

== See also ==
- Sso (ethnic group), of southern Cameroon
- Sso (rite), an initiation rite once practised by the Beti of Cameroon
- SS0, a postcode in the SS postcode area
