= Heinrich Vieter =

Heinrich Vieter SAC
- Vicar Apostolic of Cameroun
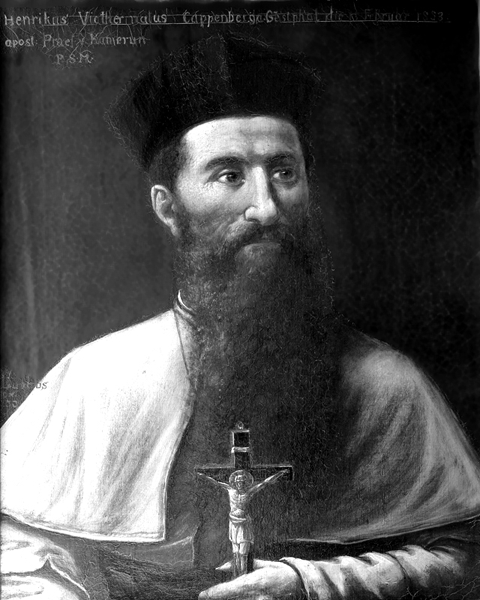
- Church: Catholic Church
- See: Apostolic Vicariate of Cameroun
- In office: 18 March 1890 – 7 November 1914
- Predecessor: Prefecture erected
- Successor: Franziskus Hennemann
- Other post: Titular Bishop of Paraetonium (1905-1914)

Orders
- Ordination: 1887
- Consecration: 22 January 1905 by Dominikus Willi

Personal details
- Born: 13 February 1853 Cappenberg, Selm, Province of Westphalia, Kingdom of Prussia, German Confederation
- Died: 7 November 1914 (aged 61) Jaunde, Kamerun, German Empire

Heinrich Vieter, SAC (13 February 1853, Selm – 7 November 1914, Jaunde) was a German Pallottine missionary to the German colony of Kamerun (today Cameroon).

== Missionary work ==
Heinrich Vieter arrived in Douala with seven other members of the mission on 25 October 1890. Over the next 13 years, Vieter led the Pallottines as they opened missions and schools across the territory.

He befriended the young Ntsama Atangana at the mission school in Kribi; Atangana would later gift the Pallottines with land in Jaunde (Yaoundé) in Kamerun.

When a Bulu leader Martin-Paul Samba was sentenced to death for treason against Germany in 1914, Vieter appealed for a stay, but his requests were ignored.

== Teaching ==
Vieter taught at the Seminar für Orientalische Sprachen (SOS; usually known in English as the Oriental Seminary) in Berlin sometime between 1909 and 1915, along with Hermann Nekes.

== Beatification ==
A process of beatification of Vieter was initiated by the Archbishop of Jaunde in early 2005, on the 100th anniversary of the establishment of the Apostolic Vicariate of Cameroon.
