= Omgba Bissogo =

Ewondo tribal chief and warrior

- Born: c. 1855; Ewondo territory, Kamerun
- Died: 1896; Jaunde, Kamerun
- Occupations: Tribal chief, warrior
- Known for: Leading the 1895 Ewondo resistance against German colonial forces

Omgba Bissogo(c. 1855 – 1896) was an Ewondo tribal chief and warrior who, during the colonial period in Cameroon in 1895, led a rebellion against German forces present in Cameroon. Omgba Bissogo was the head of the Ewondo Mvog Ottou sublineage. Bissogo and his army won their initial battles against the Germans.This was the first German defeat on Cameroonian soil. However, the Germans responded with a brutal strike against the Mvog Ottou tribe even committing crimes against civilians. Bissogo was betrayed and arrested thanks to one of his numerous wives who revealed his cache to the Germans. He was immediately put in jail in the German station in Jaunde (present-day Yaoundé) and beheaded. This defeat and the brutality of the German response would later have a great impact on the future Powermount Chief of the Ewondo and Bene Charles Atangana who in his book Jaunde Texte talks about the fallen hero. Even today the tales praising Omgba Bissogo's fierceness and courage against the German invaders are part of the Beti folklore.
