= Pallottine mission to Kamerun =

Roman Catholic mission in Africa, 1890–1916

The Pallottine Mission to Kamerun (also spelled Pallotin or Pallotine) was a Catholic mission to the German colony of Kamerun run by the Pallottines in the late 19th and early 20th centuries. When the German Empire became the colonial power of Kamerun in 1884, French Catholic groups were denied permission to set up a mission in the territory. The Germans were not eager to allow Catholics in at all, let alone foreign ones. They relented two years later when the German and Swiss-run Pallottines requested entry. Permission came with the following conditions: The Pallottines were not to compete directly with the already established Protestant Basel Mission, they were to accept no orders from any non-German authority, they were to employ only German or African staff, and they were to use and teach only the German language.

Eight Pallottine Fathers arrived in Douala on 25 October 1890 under the leadership of Father Heinrich Vieter. Presbyterian missionaries already operating there proved unfriendly to the newcomers, so the Pallottines based themselves at Marienberg, near Edéa. Over the next 13 years, the Fathers opened missions and schools in Kribi, Edéa, Bonjongo, Douala, Batanga, Jaunde, Ikassa, Minlaba, Sasse, Victoria-Bota, Dschang, Ossing (Mamfe), and in the district of Douala Deïdo. In 1899, they founded a convent in Bonjongo. The Pallottine Fathers won their first convert, Andreas Mbangue, in 1899.

When the Allied West African Campaign of World War I reached Jaunde in 1916, the Pallottines fled south to Spanish Guinea with German forces and Ewondo villagers under the command of Charles Atangana. Germany lost the war and Kamerun was split into British and French League of Nations mandate territories. The French opted to allow their own Holy Ghost Fathers to replace the Pallottines as the Catholic mission to Cameroun.

The German Pallottines returned to independent Cameroon in 1964.

== See also ==
- Cathedral of Saints Peter and Paul in Douala
