= Martin-Paul Samba =

Cameroonian resistance fighter and military officer

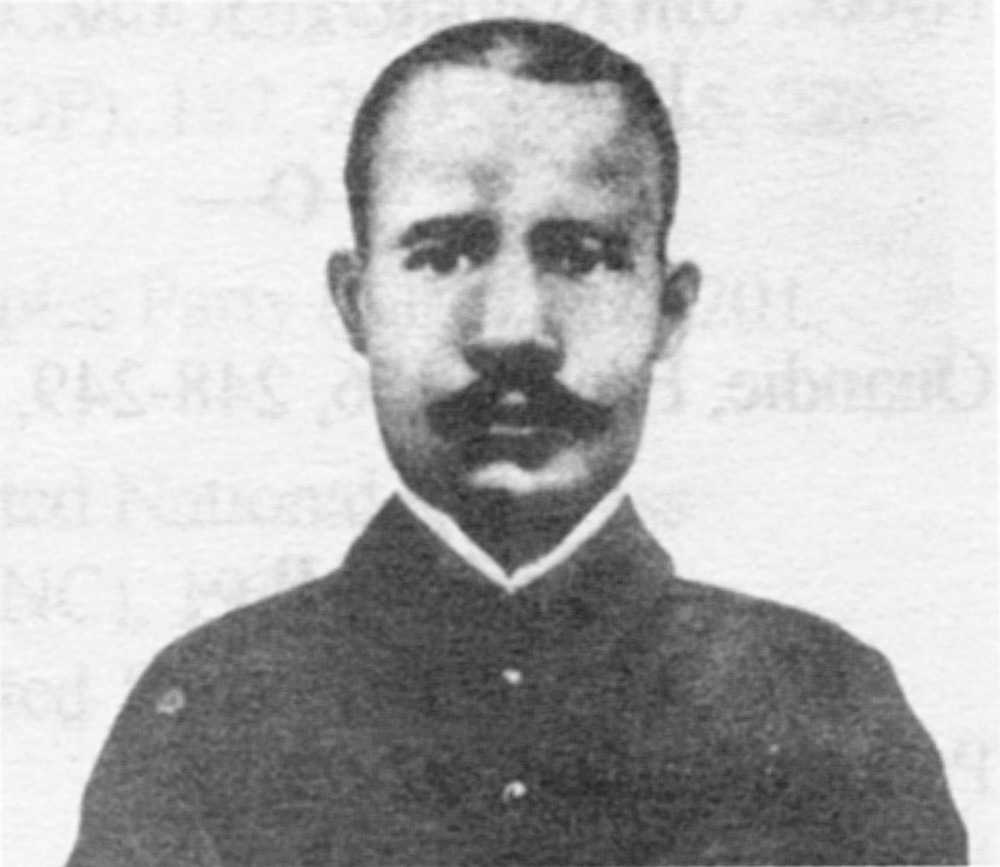
- Born: Mebenga m'Ebono c. 1875
- Died: 8 August 1914 (aged 38–39)

Martin-Paul Samba, born Mebenga m'Ebono (c. 1875 – 8 August 1914) was a Bulu military officer during the Imperial German colonial period of Cameroon. M'Ebono became a favourite of the German colonials during his upbringing in Kribi, a coastal settlement in southern Cameroon. He was sent to Germany in 1891 to enter the German Military Academy; he was baptised Martin-Paul Samba while abroad. Upon graduation, Samba returned to Cameroon and accompanied German military expeditions across the colony.

Samba resigned his commission in 1902 and entered private business in Ebolowa. He began to plot an uprising against the Germans. He secretly contacted British and French forces to secure arms, but one such letter was intercepted. German forces arrested him and charged him with high treason. Samba was executed on 8 August 1914. Today, many Cameroonian historians view Samba as one of Cameroon's earliest heroes and nationalists. His memory is commemorated by a statue in Ebolowa.

== Childhood and German collaboration ==
Mebenga m'Ebono was born circa 1875 in a village known as Metoutou-Engong, near Ebolowa in what is today the South Province of Cameroon. He was a member of the Yemeyema clan of the Bulu ethnic group. When Mebenga's was orphaned as an infant, his uncle, Oban Ebono, took the child into his care. In 1885, Ebono sent Mebenga to be raised by Banoho Issamba, a Batanga man who had come to prominence as a trader in the coastal settlement of Kribi. Mebenga spent the rest of his childhood there.

The young Mebenga became a favourite of the German colonials who lived in Kribi. He entered the service of German explorer Kurt von Morgan, whom he accompanied on expeditions beginning in 1889. Two years later, Von Morgan paid to have m'Ebono educated in Germany.

Mebenga entered the German Military Academy, where he was given the name Samba. That November, he was baptised as Martin-Paul. Samba graduated in 1894 with the rank of captain.

Samba returned to Kamerun that same year. For the next seven years, he accompanied German expeditions under the command of Hans Dominik to explore the Kamerun hinterland and subjugate native resistance. Samba participated in actions against the settlements of Bati and Tibati and against several Ngila and Limba villages. Samba's own people came to view him as a turncoat. In 1902, he resigned his commission to become a businessman in Ebolowa.

== Samba the rebel ==
Samba's views slowly changed regarding the Germans. He came to disdain the colonials' mistreatment of Bulu women and children. The 1911 appointment of Karl Atangana as paramount chief of the Ewondo and Bane worried Samba, who felt that the Germans were favouring the Ewondo over the Bulu, giving the Ewondo the edge in the long rivalry between the ethnic groups. He began to entertain notions of being a great nationalist and of uniting all Kamerun under the leadership of the Bulu. Meanwhile, Samba became a chief in the Bulu hierarchy in 1910.

In 1912, Samba began actively planning an uprising. He entered correspondence with Rudolf Duala Manga Bell, a like-minded leader from the Duala ethnic group. The two decided to request aid from Germany's enemies, Samba to contact the French, and Manga Bell the British.

Meanwhile, Samba began training Bulu warriors in tactics to use against the German army. He gained the support of other southern Cameroonian leaders, including Madola of the Batanga and Edande Mbita. The rebels stockpiled weapons and munitions. Samba even requested weapons from the German themselves, ostensibly to ward off Ewondo unrest that had led to some uprisings north of Bululand.

A Bulu informant alerted the Germans of Samba's plans. By July 1914, the colonial forces were suspicious enough to search his home, where they found numerous receipts for arms purchases from British and French suppliers. At the outbreak of World War I in 1914, Samba sent a letter to the French forces at Brazzaville stating his intent to rebel and requesting aid against the Germans. Colonial forces intercepted the correspondence. Samba was arrested on 1st August 1914 and charged with high treason. His collaborators, Madola, Edande Mbita and others were also arrested when stockpiles of arms were found in their homes. The men were tried by military tribunal. All were found guilty. On 8 August 1914, Samba and his collaborators were executed by firing squad.
