= Joseph Atemengue =

Joseph Atemengue was an Ewondo headman and court leader during the French colonial period in Cameroon. After the defeat of Germany in World War I, France gained control of Ewondo lands in Cameroon. They did not trust the German-appointed paramount chief of the Ewondo and Bane peoples, Charles Atangana, due to his history of loyalty to the Germans. They instead appointed the headman Joseph Atemengue as their chief agent in the Yaoundé region. From his post in Dschang, Atangana attempted to secure an alliance with Atemengue by sending his 20-year-old daughter, Katerina, to marry the new leader. She eventually left Atemengue, who was much older, and returned to her father.

Atemengue was never as popular as Atangana had been among the Ewondo and Bane. The French removed him from office and reinstated Atangana as paramount chief in December 1921. Atemengue became the chief justice of the local court. He served satisfactorily in this position. Rue Joseph Atemengue and Plateau Atemengue in downtown Yaoundé are named for him.
