= Marie-Thérèse Assiga Ahanda =

Cameroonian writer, chemist, chief of the Ewondo people (c. 1941 – 2014)

- Born: Marie-Thérèse Atangana c. 1941; Yaoundé, Cameroon
- Died: 1 February 2014 (aged 72–73); Yaoundé, Cameroon
- Other name: Marie-Thérèse Catherine Atangana
- Occupation: Chemist Author Member of the National Assembly (Cameroon) Paramount Chief
- Notable work: Sociétés africaines et 'High Society': Petite ethnologie de l'arrivisme (1978)

Marie-Thérèse Assiga Ahanda (c. 1941 – 1 February 2014) was a Cameroonian novelist, chemist, and paramount chief of the Ewondo and Bene people. Early in life, Ahanda worked for the Chemistry Department of the University of Yaoundé. She later moved to the Republic of the Congo with her husband, Jean Baptiste Assiga Ahanda, and took to writing. When they returned to Cameroon, Ahanda became an elected delegate in the National Assembly of Cameroon, a position she held from 1983 to 1988. Ahanda became the Ewondo paramount chief in 1999. In December 2000, she began renovating her father's palace at Efoulan, Yaoundé, a project that cost an estimated 150,000,000 francs CFA. Ahanda is the daughter of Charles Atangana—paramount chief of the Ewondo and Bene peoples under the German and French colonial regimes—by his second wife, Julienne Ngonoa.

== Early life and education ==
Marie-Thérèse Assiga Ahanda (born Marie-Thérèse Atangana) was raised as a princess alongside her brother, prince René Grégoire Atangana, in Yaoundé, Cameroon. She also had one half sister, Catherine Edzimbi Atangana, and one half brother, Jean Ndengue Atangana. Both of her half-siblings were from her father's first marriage to Marie Biloa, and they were born around forty years before she was. She was the daughter of Julienne (Yuliana) Ngonoa and Charles Antangana, the paramount chief of the Ewondo and Bene people.

Ahanda's father, Charles Atangana, also known as Ntsama Atangana (birth name) or Karl Atangana (German name), died only two years after her birth in 1943. Charles Atangana always kept friendly ties to both the German and French colonial administrations. His companionship with many of the German and French officials was said to have aided in his political advancement. He was also an advocate for the westernization of Yaoundé and Cameroonian culture. His rule has been both criticized and commended globally. Marie-Thérèse Assiga Ahanda explains her father's legacy in a short biography she wrote on him, but also touches on themes of colonization in Cameroon in some of the other written works, (see Works and Publications below).

Most of Ahanda's schooling took place in Europe before the 1950s. As a princess, she had access to formal education which gave her opportunities to explore different disciplines. It was through her father's loyalty to the colonial administrations, and the power he received through it, that she was able to grow up with these opportunities. The Western-style education she received was highly influential to her writing as well.

== Personal life ==
In the early 1970s, she married Jean Baptiste Assiga Ahanda, a finance manager from Yaoundé who later held a prominent position at Banque des États de l'Afrique Centrale (BEAC; English: The Bank of Central African States). She then moved to Congo with him for several years before returning to Cameroon where they lived until she died in 2014. She was married to Jean Baptiste for roughly 40 years, and together they had four children and multiple grandchildren. Although they were together for a long time, their marriage was controversial to many. Jean Baptiste was of the large Etoudi clan, which was outside of her own clan. Most of this controversy surrounding their marriage was based on questions as to why they were married and if there were any political incentive or gain.

== Professional life ==
Marie-Thérèse Assiga Ahanda ventured into many disciplines after receiving her education in Europe and returning to Yaoundé. She first worked as a chemist in her early life before getting involved in politics. She worked for a few years at the University of Yaoundé in the science department for her career in chemistry.

=== Author ===
After doing chemistry for a few years, Ahanda took to writing books and articles. Her main goal as an author was to make her mark in history. Some of her published works include:

- Sociétés africaines et 'High Society': Petite ethnologie de l'arrivisme (1978)
- Je suis raciste (1982)
- "Turbulences" in Mots Pluriels (1999)

These works were published after Cameroon's independence in 1960. The novel Sociétés africaines et 'High Society': Petite ethnologie de l'arrivisme touches on themes of westernization and colonialism. It is about a young couple, Mathilde and Vincent, who both lived abroad and received Western education. When they came back to their homeland, they were astonished by the after effects of colonial rule, such as post-colonial corruption. They later became obsessed with power and found themselves intertwined in the system. Ahanda also uses Mathilde to draw upon the theme of sexism in the novel. Mathilde, the main female character's intelligence is highly underestimated and disregarded by most of the authoritative characters. This was said to highlight societal or systematic oppression that most women face, in order to motivate her female readers to improve their situations.

This novel also indicates the importance of individualism and individual rights in combating neo-colonialism. However, this individualistic perspective may come from the influence of the Westernized notion of individualism, as opposed to collectivism seen in the traditional village system. In other words, through her writing she uses colonial influences to fight neo-colonialism.

=== Deputy of the National Assembly ===
After publishing her first two novels, Marie-Thérèse Assiga Ahanda returned to Cameroon. She served as a deputy for the National Assembly of Cameroon for five years, between 1983 and 1988. As a previous chemist and author, this was her first experience of political involvement outside of the duties of being a princess. She did however understand politics, corruption, and history through the research she conducted for her novel Sociétés africaines et 'High Society': Petite ethnologie de l'arrivisme. Cameroonian president Ahmadou Ahidjo resigned in 1982, and Paul Biya, the prime minister at the time, took over. Ahanda was mostly instrumental in making decisions regarding chiefdoms, or the hierarchical system of chiefs.

Years prior to Ahanda's birth, before any colonial figures came to that region of Cameroon, the chief of the Etoa Meki village (present day Yaoundé) was Essono Ela. When the German colonial administration came in, they appointed Charles Atangana as chief supreme, and imprisoned Essono Ela in front of his people. Essono Ela was considered a rebel in the eyes of the colonial administration. Essono Ela's nephew, Fouda Anaba, became a very powerful and influential individual in politics. He had a strong relationship with president Ahmadou Ahidjo, and allegedly persuaded some of his decisions. Fouda Anaba advocated for getting rid of the position of superior chief of the Ewondo and Bene people as he felt this specific position was reignited by the German colonial administration. His advocating worked, and this position, along with many other traditional systems were uprooted.

In 1977 after independence, the constitutional decree #77/609 called for the restoration of these traditional systems alongside the current political system. During her time as a deputy, Marie-Thérèse Assiga Ahanda fought for the reestablishment of this position and adherence to constitutional decree #77/609. If this were to be achieved, she would be throned as chief of the Ewondo and Bene people, as it was her traditional blood right. She was confronted with much backlash from many Ewondo people, not because of the colonial ties to her father, but mainly because she was a woman. It was not customary among the Ewondo for women to hold such high positions of power. Her own marriage also caused controversy since she married outside of her clan. Because of these two aspects, many Ewondo people, including some members of her own family denounced her title.

=== Chieftaincy ===
After the decree #77/609 was successfully implemented in the 1990s, most ethnic groups in Cameroon had reestablished chieftaincies. There were three levels of chieftaincies that were described in the constitutional decree. The third degree chieftaincies are representatives of their distinct territories in each neighborhood. Second degree chieftaincies are representatives of groups of neighborhoods in a certain area. The first degree chieftaincies are representatives of entire districts (known as paramount chiefs). In Yaoundé there are around 350 third degree chiefs, 7 second degree chiefs, and one first degree chief.

In 1999 Marie-Thérèse Assiga Ahanda was the first female to be throned paramount chief of the Ewondo and Bene people- the official title of Yaoundé's first degree chief. She served as the chief of the Ewondo and Bene people of Yaoundé for fifteen years (1999–2014). Her coronation ceremony took place in Yaoundé and lasted several hours. It was filled with performances, decor, and practices from both Cameroonian and European influences. Hundreds of guests were invited to the event, and many tuned in to local TV and radio broadcasting to experience it live.

There was much controversy concerning her appointment to this position, mostly due to traditional, gendered, and political concerns. Many people felt that she would not be qualified for the position because of her marriage as well as her status as a woman. She fought for her right to be on the throne, while in the process losing much support from not only public figures, but family as well.

There is currently no successor for the title of paramount chief of the Ewondo and Bene people.

== Death ==
Ahanda died on 1 February 2014, at the age of seventy-two. Her health was said to have been declining in her final years. She made very little public appearances, and dedicated most of her resources towards the rehabilitation of her father's palace in Yaoundé as a landmark. Her death was said to be peaceful, however the public was not given much detail about it or the happenings in the royal home at the time. It was noted that she was a fairly private individual herself.

== Works and publications ==
- Sociétés africaines et 'High Society': Petite ethnologie de l'arrivisme (1978). ISBN 978-2862090023
- Je suis raciste (1982)
- "Turbulences" in Mots Pluriels (1999). ISSN 1327-6220
