= Mouloudou =

Mouloudou is a settlement in the East Province of Cameroon. Of the tropical forest in the area, 1,082,454 km^{2} is protected for community hunting. Mouloudou was the site of a German station during the colonial period. The station was set up by Hans Dominik with the aid of Karl Atangana.
