= Cathedral of Saints Peter and Paul, Douala =

Cathedral of Saints Peter and Paul
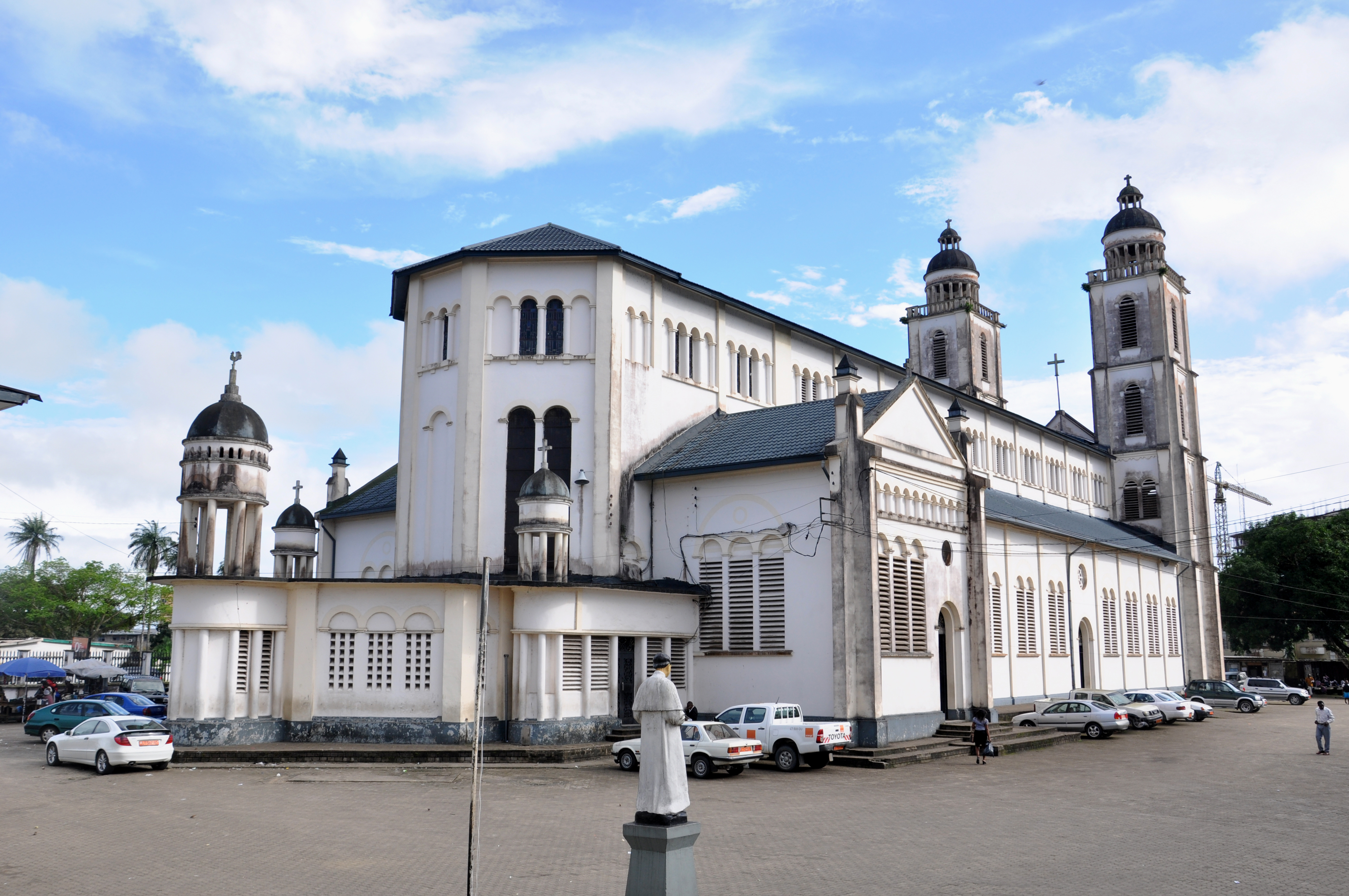
- Front view

Religion
- Affiliation: Roman Catholic Archdiocese of Douala
- Rite: Latin
- Status: Active

Location
- Location: Douala
- State: Cameroon
- Interactive map of Cathedral of Saints Peter and Paul
- Coordinates: 4.0443°N 9.6927°E

Architecture
- Type: Cathedral
- Completed: 1936

The Cathedral of Saints Peter and Paul - situated in Douala, Cameroon - is the cathedral of the Roman Catholic Archdiocese of Douala and dedicated to St Peter and St Paul.

== History ==
The Cathedral of St Peter and St Paul was built in 1936 by French Spiritans fathers and it is based on the legacy of the fathers Pallotins.

The advent of Catholicism in Cameroon has its origins in Germany through the baptism of the first Cameroonian catechumen, Andreas Kwa Mbange, on January 6, 1889. Born in 1873, he reaches the age of 14 years to learn the craft baker. He then discovers the Catholic cult in a Benedictine Monastery and asks to be baptized. Following the christening, the question of evangelization in Cameroon was discussed in Berlin and Rome. The year 1890 is decisive. In March, a decree of Pope Leo XIII creates the apostolic prefecture of Cameroon and entrusts the Pallottines Missionaries. On October 25, 1890, the father Vieter, prefect apostolic landed at Kamerunstadt (Douala), the head of a delegation of seven missionaries. The following day, October 26, 1890, he celebrates the first Catholic mass in Cameroonian land, in the Woermann factory in Bonanjo, then known as Belldorf. But in December 1890, faced with the hostility of Protestants who want to keep the hand-setting Kamerunstadt, Catholic missionaries were forced to leave the coast. They founded the first Catholic mission in Cameroon in Marienberg (Sanaga). The local rivalries between Catholics and Protestants was also expressed about the language of instruction for denominational school, an indispensable tool for religious propaganda. The Pallotins leave Cameroon in the wake of the Germans after their defeat in 1914, and are replaced by French Spiritans in 1916.

== Architecture ==
Its columns and domes give it a Byzantine air. It also has neo-Roman architectural elements, including its porch. Two twin towers surround the central front.

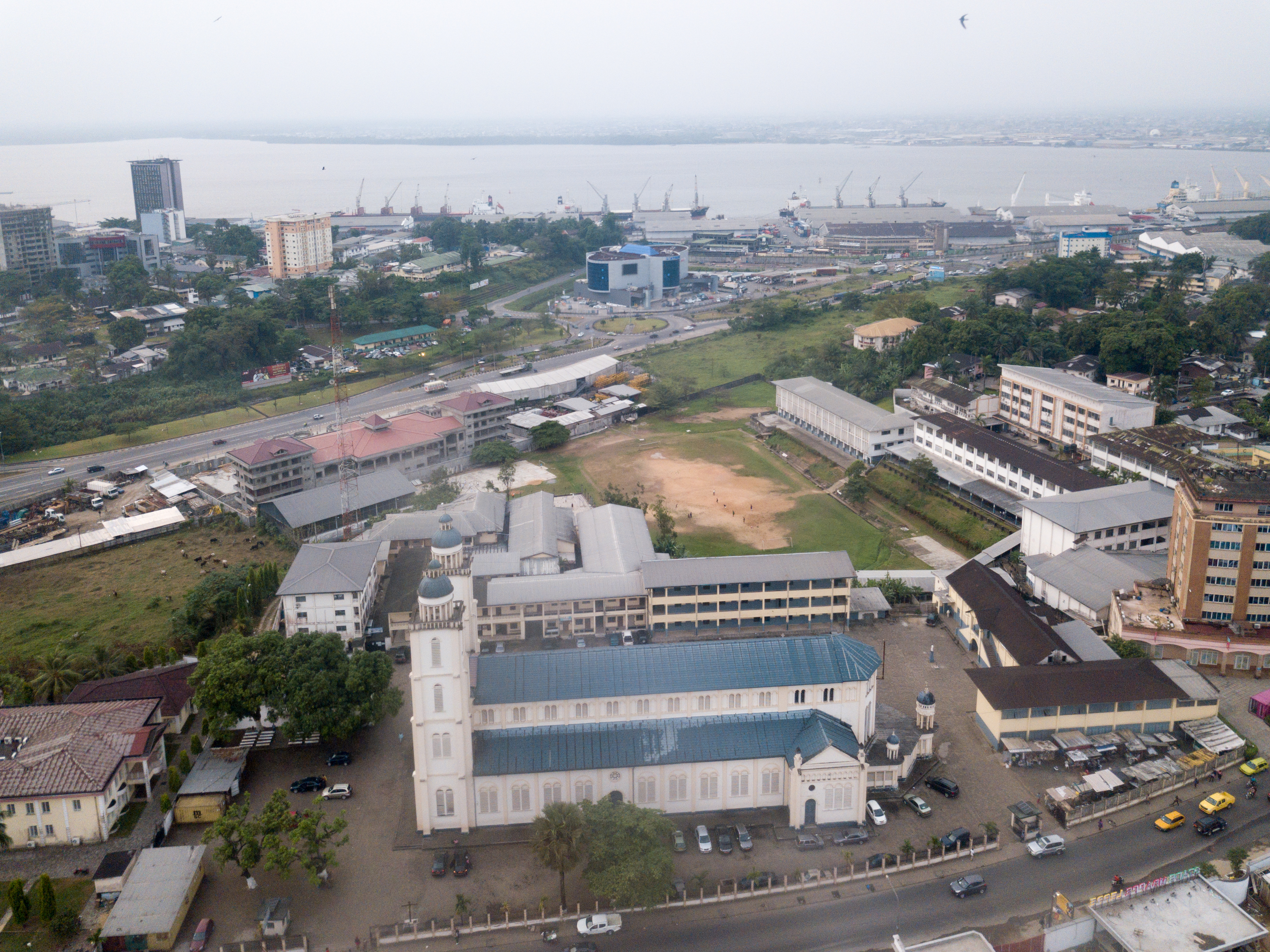

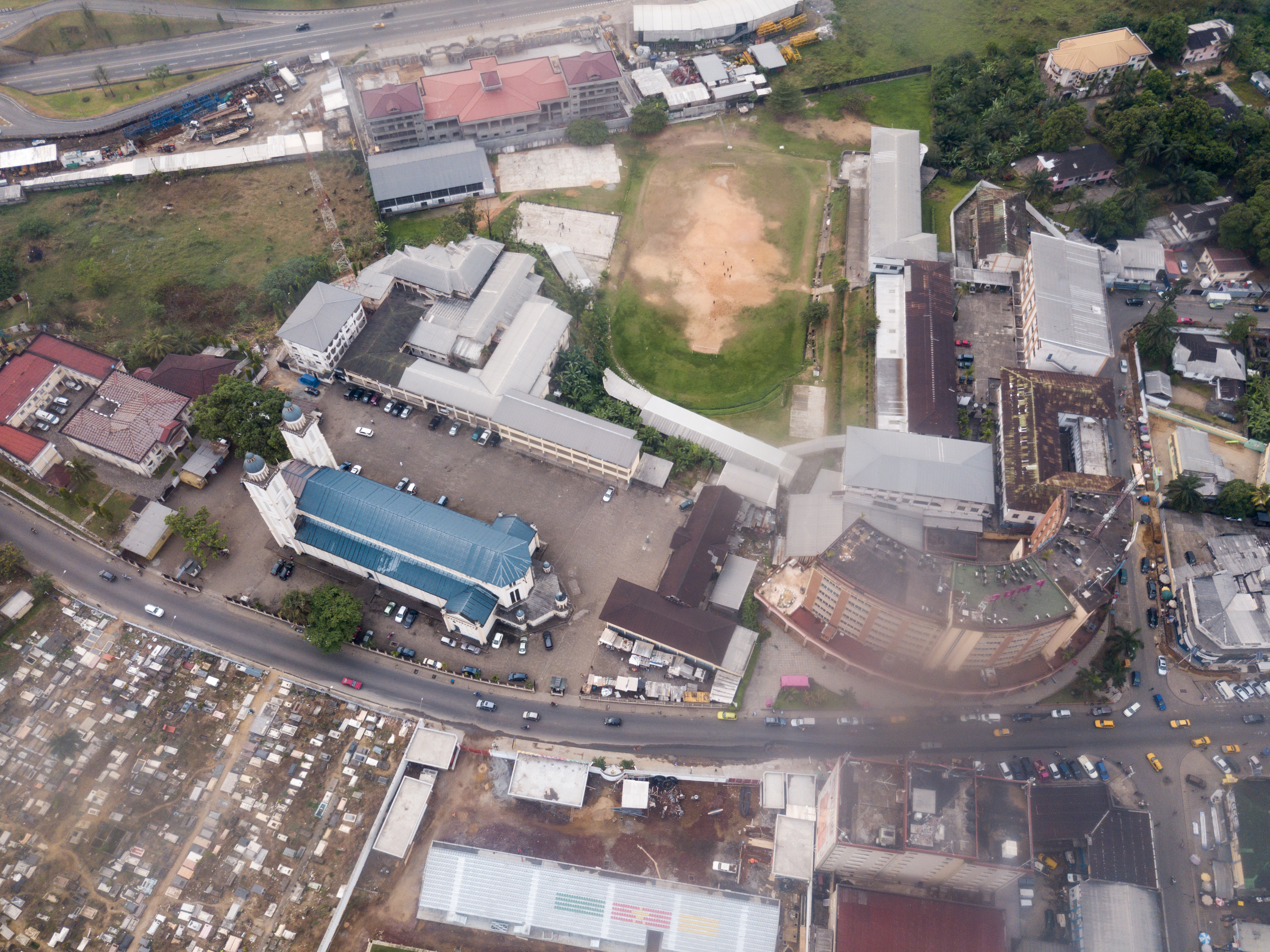

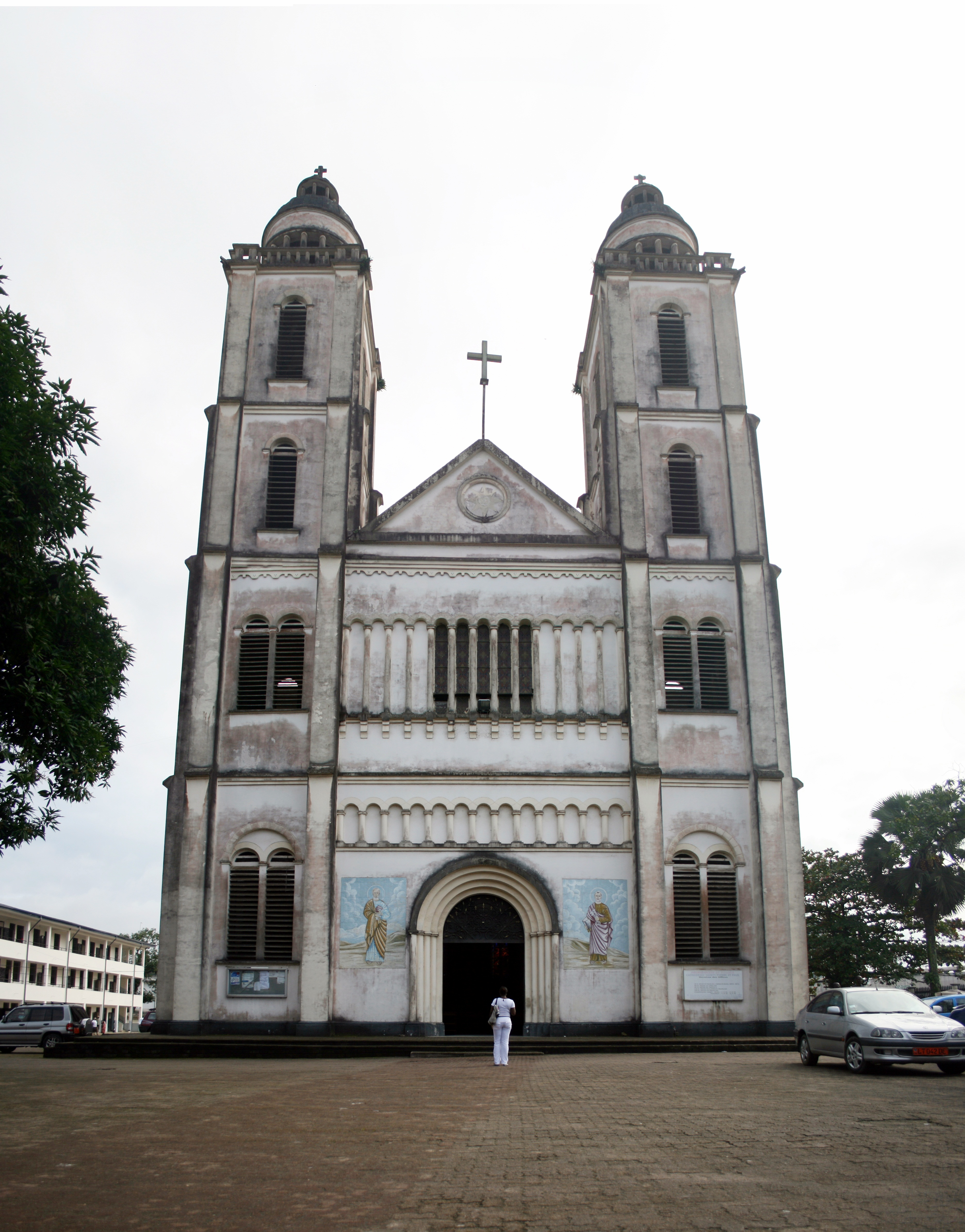

== See also ==
- Roman Catholic Archdiocese of Douala
- Roman Catholicism in Cameroon
- List of cathedrals in Cameroon
- Pallottine mission to Kamerun
