= Jaunde-Texte von Karl Atangana und Paul Messi =

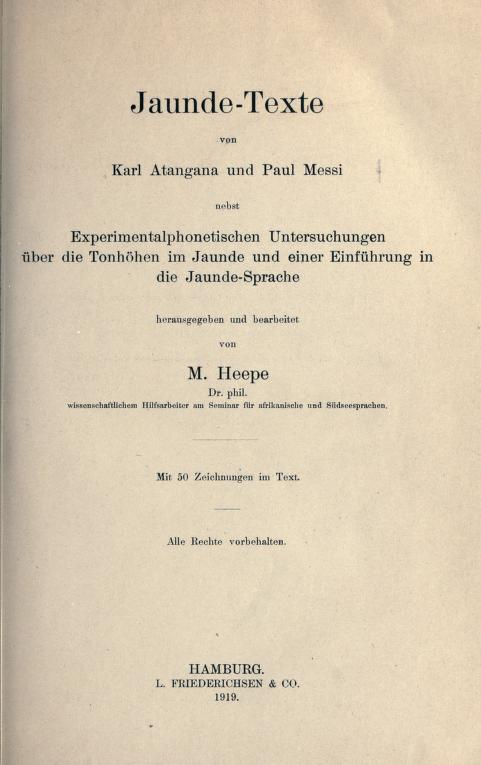
- Author: Karl Atangana and Paul Messi
- Publication date: 1919

Jaunde-Texte von Karl Atangana und Paul Messi is a book written by Karl Atangana and Paul Messi and edited by linguist Martin Heppe. Atangana compiled the book while living in Hamburg, Germany, from 1911 to 1913. It consists of his letters and of the folklore and oral history he had learned as a young Ewondo boy in Africa prior to the establishment of the German Kamerun colony. It was published in Hamburg in 1919. Today, the Jaunde-Texte is an important source on the early history of the Ewondo and related peoples.

The Jaunde-Texte also provides insight into Atangana's beliefs and character. He wrote of his hosts, "To dare to approach the Germans it is necessary to abandon the traits which displease them, to become their friend and then be valued by them."
