= List of cathedrals in Cameroon =

This is the list of cathedrals in Cameroon.

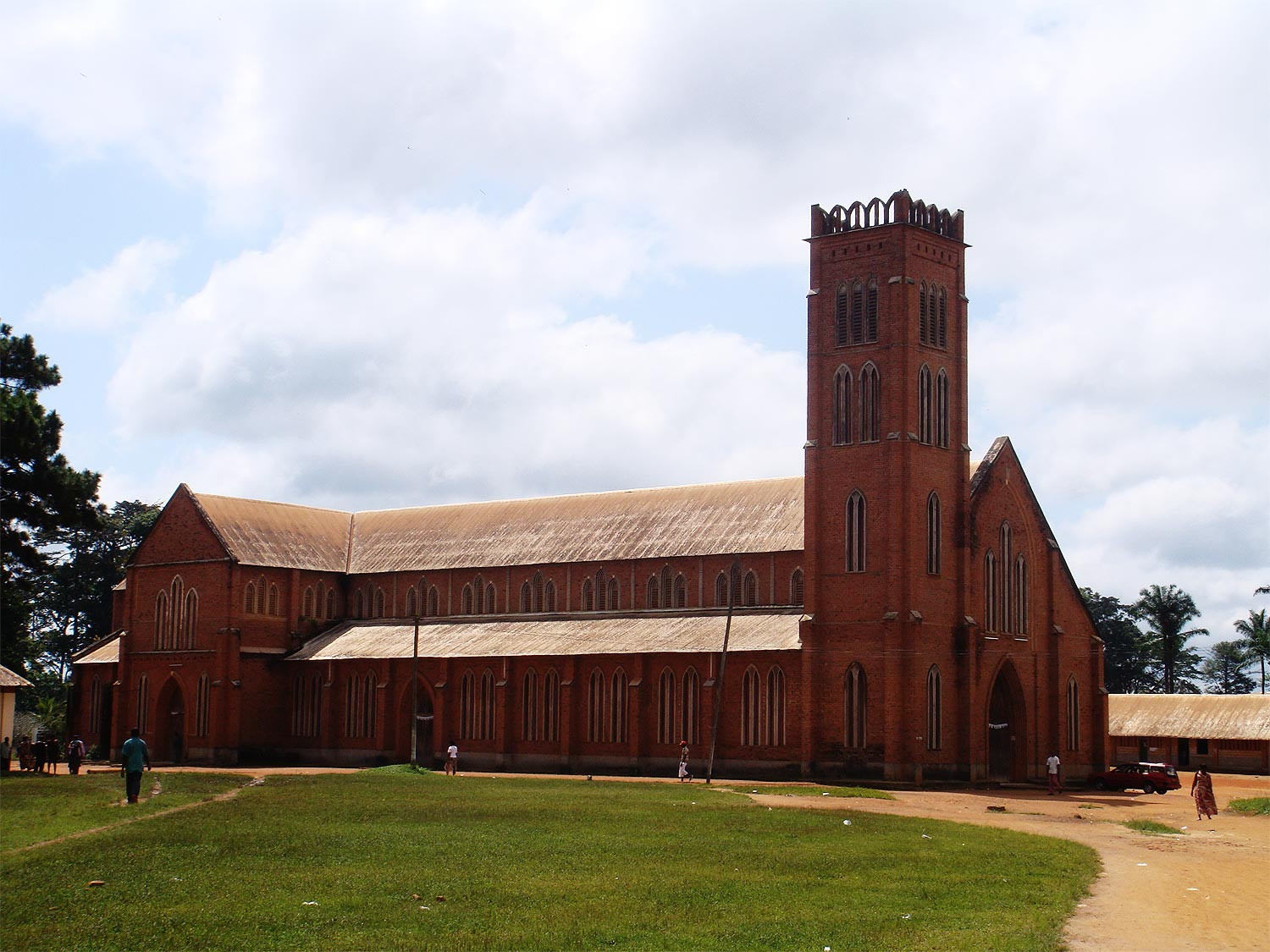
Cathedral of the Holy Rosary in Mbalmayo.

== Catholic ==
Cathedrals of the Catholic Church in Cameroon:

- Cathedral of St. Joseph in Bafoussam
- St. Joseph's Metropolitan Cathedral in Bamenda
- Cathedral of Our Lady in Batouri
- Holy Family Cathedral in Bertoua
- Regina Pacis Cathedral in Buéa
- Cathedral of Sts. Peter and Paul in Douala
- Cathedral of St. Ann and St. Joachim in Ebolowa
- Cathedral of Our Lady of Fatima in Eseka
- Cathedral of St. Theresa of the Child Jesus in Garoua
- Cathedral of St. Joseph in Kribi
- St. Theresa Cathedral in Kumbo
- St. Joseph's Cathedral in Mamfe
- Cathedral of Our Lady of the Assumption in Maroua
- Cathedral of the Holy Rosary in Mbalmayo
- Cathedral of Our Lady of the Apostles in Ngaoundéré
- Cathedral of Our Lady in Sangmélima
- Cathedral of St. Ann in Yagoua
- Cathedral of Our Lady of Victories in Yaoundé

== See also ==
- Catholic Church in Cameroon
- List of cathedrals
- Archdiocese of Douala
