= Adamawa Wars =

1899–1907 German expeditions in Cameroon

Coordinates: 5.15°N 12.45°E

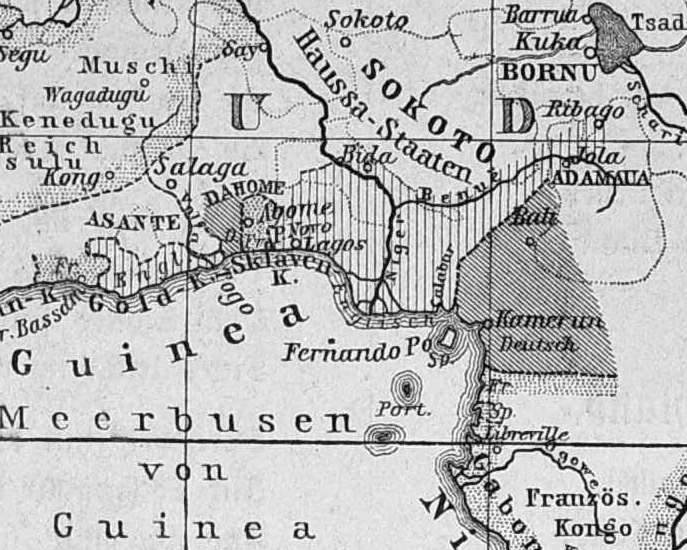
- German Map of Guinean Gulf Area, 1890 (German Kamerun highlighted in thin black stripes, bordered by the Emirate of Adamawa to the North East)
Date	January 1899 – August 1907
Location	Adamawa, Northern Cameroon
Result	German victory: Annexation of Adamawa; Along with British actions in Nigeria, the dissolution of the Sokoto Caliphate

Belligerents
German Empire: German Kamerun; Co-belligerent British Empire (1901-1903)	Sokoto Caliphate: Adamawa Emirate; various other Fula and Hausa tribes and sultanates
	Mahdist Rebels

Commanders and leaders
(German Empire) Jesko von Puttkamer (German Empire) Curt von Pavel (German Empire) Rudolf Cramer von Clausbruch (German Empire) Hans Dominik (British Empire) Thomas Morland	Abdur Rahman Atiku; Muhammad Attahiru I Zubeiru bi Adama

The Adamawa Wars (1899–1907) were initially a series of military expeditions and border conflicts between the German Schutztruppe in Kamerun and the Fula and Hausa Sunni Muslim states and tribes that were a part of the Sokoto Empire (a Caliphate formed during the Fulani Jihad), particularly the Emirate of Adamawa in the northern half of the region. After these territories were annexed major resistance continued for years and several uprisings occurred.

== Background ==
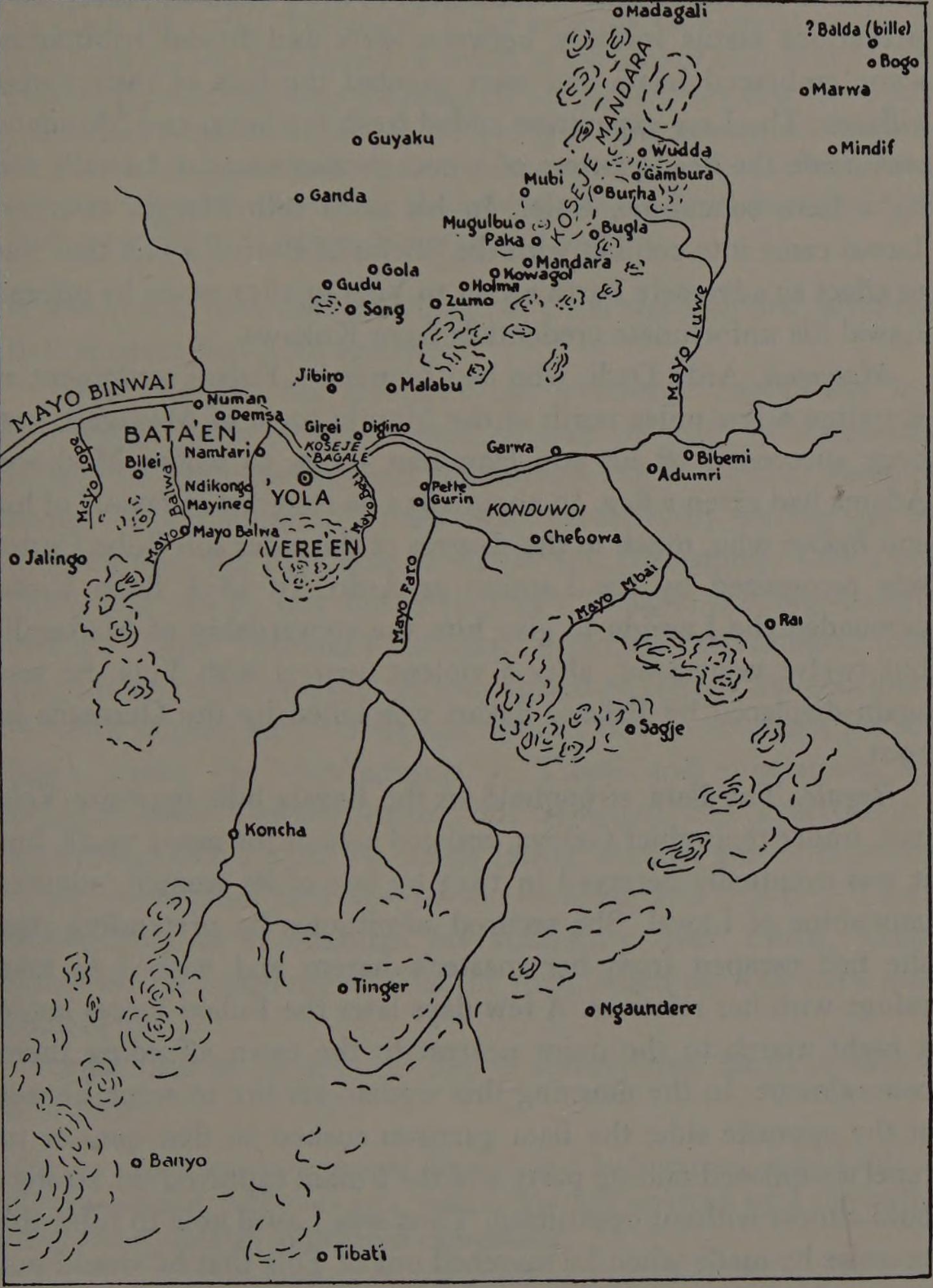
Map showing most of the Adamawa area in the 19th-century.

The territories to the north of the portion of Kamerun under direct German control were part of either the Bornu or Sokoto Empires, the latter was (along with the Ottoman Empire) one of the worlds last remaining Caliphates. While the power of Bornu to resist was weakened after its temporary conquest by the Sudanese warlord Rabih az-Zubayr, Sokoto remained intact. Sokoto was an Islamic empire that controlled semi-autonomous emirates, the largest being Adamawa. By 1890 Adamawa was weakened by internal struggle, as a Mahdist state had developed within the Emirate, and its borders overlapped with German colonial claims in the region, though it remained defiant on ceding territory. A German expedition to explore Adamawa was conducted in 1893.

For economic and political reasons, the Germans were determined to expand the colony into Adamawa, so exploration expeditions to survey the region began, with the intention of eventually taking it by force. However, until 1898, the Germans were still primarily focused on the Bafut Wars, attempting to conquer and pacify the chiefdoms of central and northwestern Kamerun, rather than spreading northeast.

== Tibati Expedition ==
The military expeditions to expand German Kamerun north toward the Sahel, under the pretext of ending the Islamic slave trade in the region, began in earnest in January 1899, with the Schutztruppe under the command of Captain Oltwig von Kamptz leaving Douala for the north to subjugate the Tibati Sultanate in southern Adamawa. Tibati resisted fiercely, and the Bulu tribe on the former southern border of Adamawa rose up in revolt, the Bulu warriors marching to Kribi on the coast and destroyed the Catholic mission there. Only after an increase in troops in the colony and a severe campaign lasting until 1901 was the region pacified and the Tibati Sultan captured, his palace taken by storm.

== Conquest of the Adamawa Plateau and Advance to Lake Chad ==
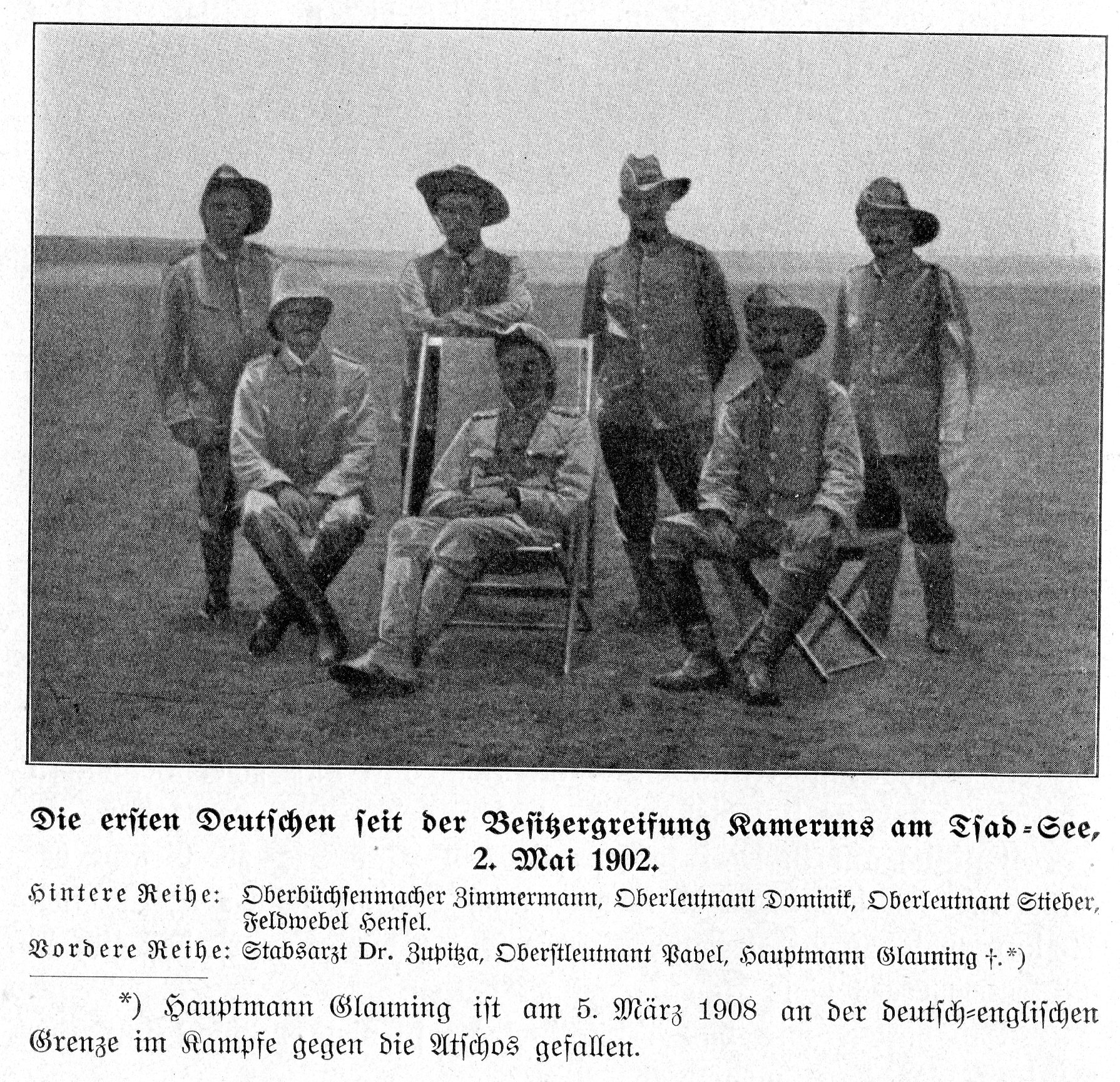
Hans Dominik, Oscar Zimmerman, Curt von Pavel and other German officers rest for a photo after reaching Lake Chad. (May 2, 1902)

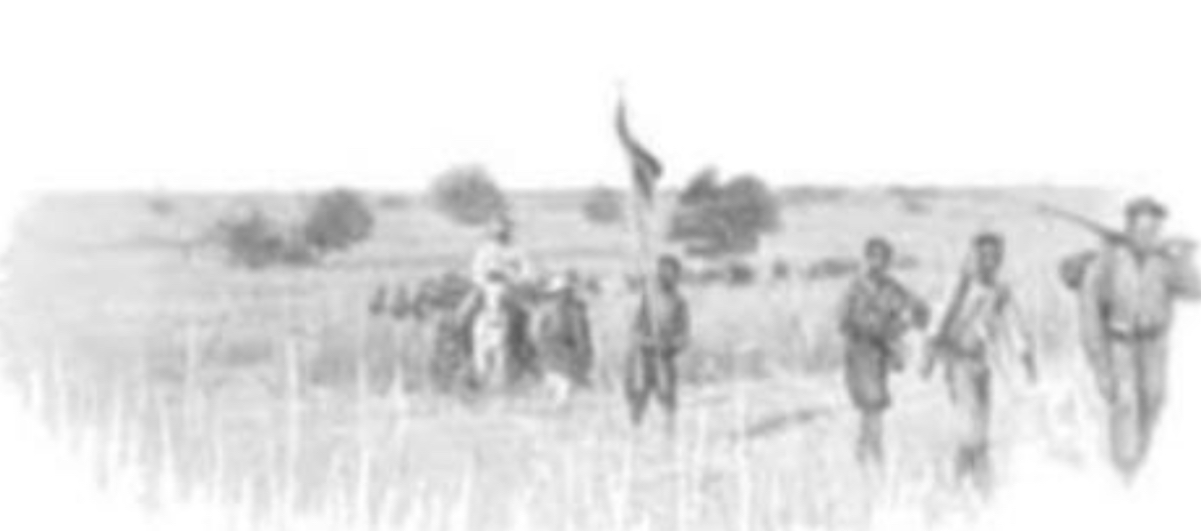
German Schutztruppe Colonial forces advance across the Adamawa Steppe

The Germans had in the late 1890s taken a more military approach with Adamawa with the conquest of the Tibati Sultanate, which was favored by the governor of the Kamerun colony Jesko von Puttkamer, despite attempts to peacefully penetrate the region through Christian missionaries, the approach favored by Adolph Woermann, an influential merchant in the colony. However, in the summer of 1901, and despite previous conflict with the Emirate, Lieutenant Hans Dominik was ordered to meet with Emir Zubeiru bi Adama to reach an agreement on the contested territories and for the prospect of turning Adamawa into a protectorate of the German Empire, as Germany claimed all of the territory between the Sanaga River and Lake Chad, and conduct an expedition to the far north. However, ignoring orders from governor Puttkamer, Colonel Rudolf Cramer von Clausbruch brought his Schutztruppe from the west and invaded Adamawa, storming the city of Ngaoundéré on August 20. Seeing an opportunity to claim their portion of the Emirate, the British sent a force under Colonel Thomas Morland from Nigeria to attack and occupy Yola in September, causing Emir Zubairu to flee from his own capital city.

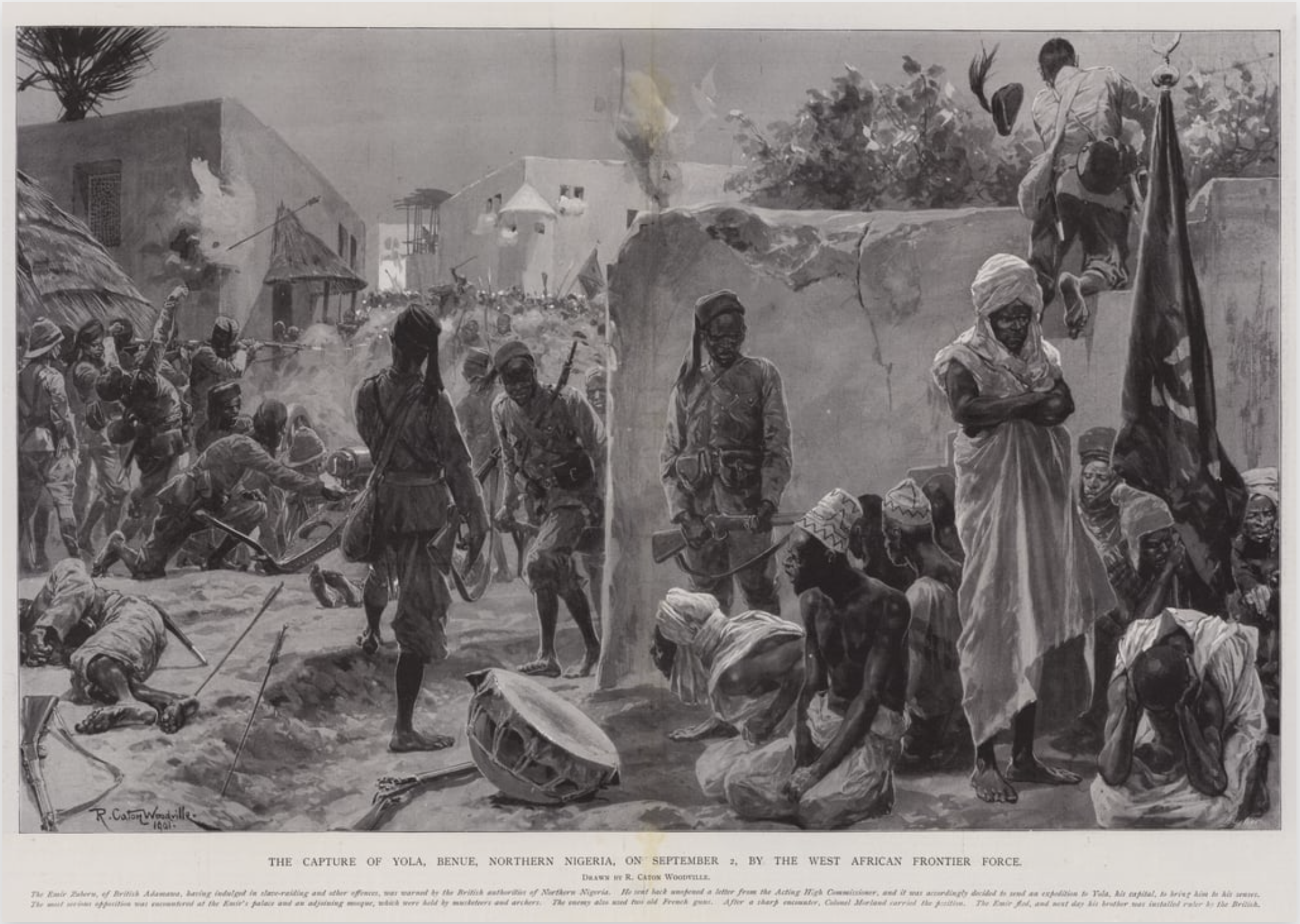
Depiction of the British capture of Yola.

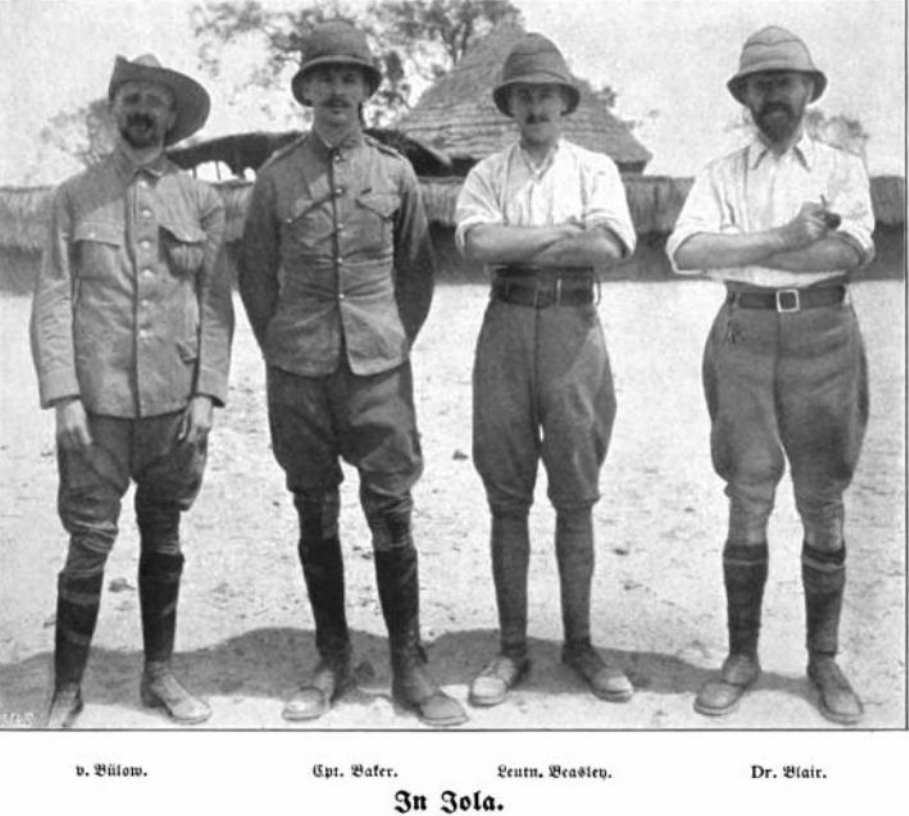
German officer with British officers of the Morland Expedition in Yola.

Dominik with his force fought their way northwest to Ngaoundéré where they linked up with Clausbruch's troops before attacking across the Benue River capturing the city of Garoua. One of Fula rulers opposing the German advance (like most of his contemporaries) was Mal Hammadou, whose forces were devastated by the Germans. Lieutenant Radke, leading a force of 47 men, marched on Hammadou's capital of Rei Buba by November, and attacked a strong Fulani force at a position just outside of the town, almost losing the battle, but being able to defeat and route the enemy in a final bayonet charge before marching on Rei Buba itself. Hammadou's capital was bombarded by cannons before being captured, causing him to flee. The Germans replaced him as local leader (holding the title Ardo) with Bouba Djama.

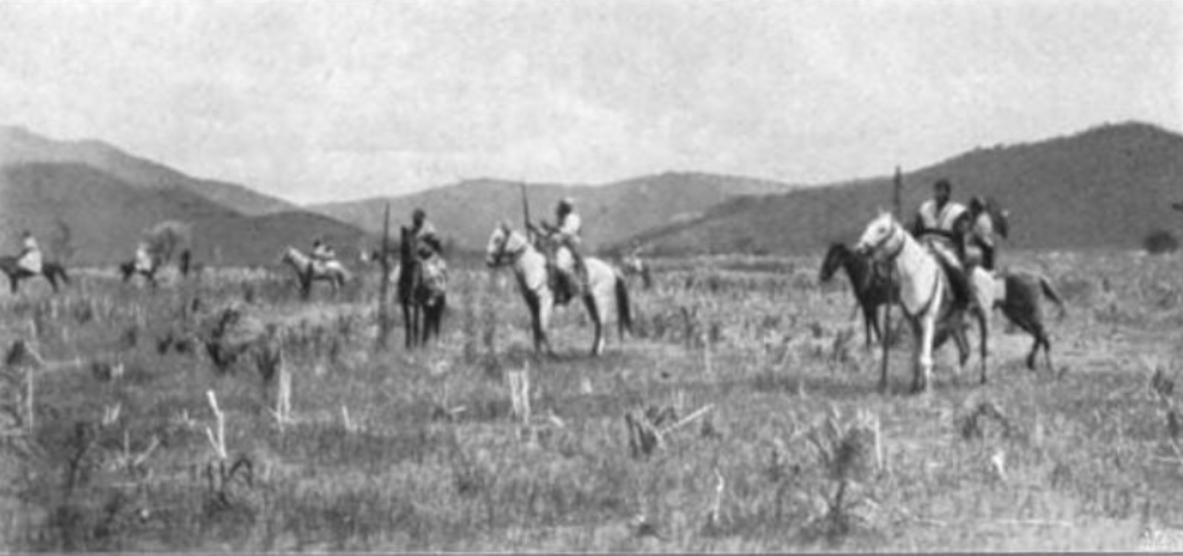
Fulani cavalry in Adamawa

Zubairu went to gather support in Sokoto and returned with a large force of Fulani cavalry and infantry, and also appealed for support from the Mahdist movement in Adamawa, no longer an enemy to the Emir since the death of Hayatu ibn Sa'id in the 1890s, and who sympathized with the Emir's call for jihad against the German invaders. However, informants told the Germans of Zubairu's plans, despite this the Germans wanted to hold peace talks in Garoua and use Zubairu as a puppet, allowing him to stay in power in return for his help winning over the other sultanates and emirates in Sokoto. Instead the Emir attacked Garoua with a much larger force in November 1901. However Zubairu was defeated and routed, his force suffered some 300 dead. Fleeing toward Maroua, Zubairu tried to raise another force, but Lieutenant Dominik led a small force of Schutztruppe in pursuit. At the decisive Battle of Maroua another Fulani force of cavalry led by Zubairu and Ahmadu Rufai, supported by Mahdist sympathizers, was again defeated by the Schutztruppe, although Zubairu and Rufai again escaped.

After the Battle at Maroua, Zubairu and many of his supporters fled into the Mandara Mountains deeper into the Sokoto Empire. Hans Dominik had the local Fulani ruler Bakari Yadji executed for assisting Zubairu's escape in this region to Madagali, and his son Hamman was placed as local ruler instead. With the military defeat and expulsion of Zubairu as a spiritual and political overlord of the Fulani in Adamawa, the German colonial administration annexed the region from Sokoto, broke the historic ties to the Fulani's center Yola and replaced them with the connection to the seat of the residency Garoua as a new political and economic center.

In April 1902, Sultan Umar of Mandara swore allegiance to German Emperor Kaiser Wilhelm II, and by early May 1902, an expedition had reached the southern shores of Lake Chad. Despite being in exile Zubairu sent agents to get revenge on the Germans. In January 1903, one of his agents, Yerima Mustapha, arranged to meet and then assassinated the German resident of Maroua, Graf Fugger, with a poisoned dart, prompting Dominik to engage in a harsh occupation of the city. Zubairu himself was killed later that year by his tribal rivals in British Nigeria. In 1903, Germany and Britain officially partitioned the region, which was followed by the formal ending of the Sokoto Caliphate. This established complete German control of northern Kamerun up to the shores of Lake Chad in Bornu.

== Mahdist Uprising ==
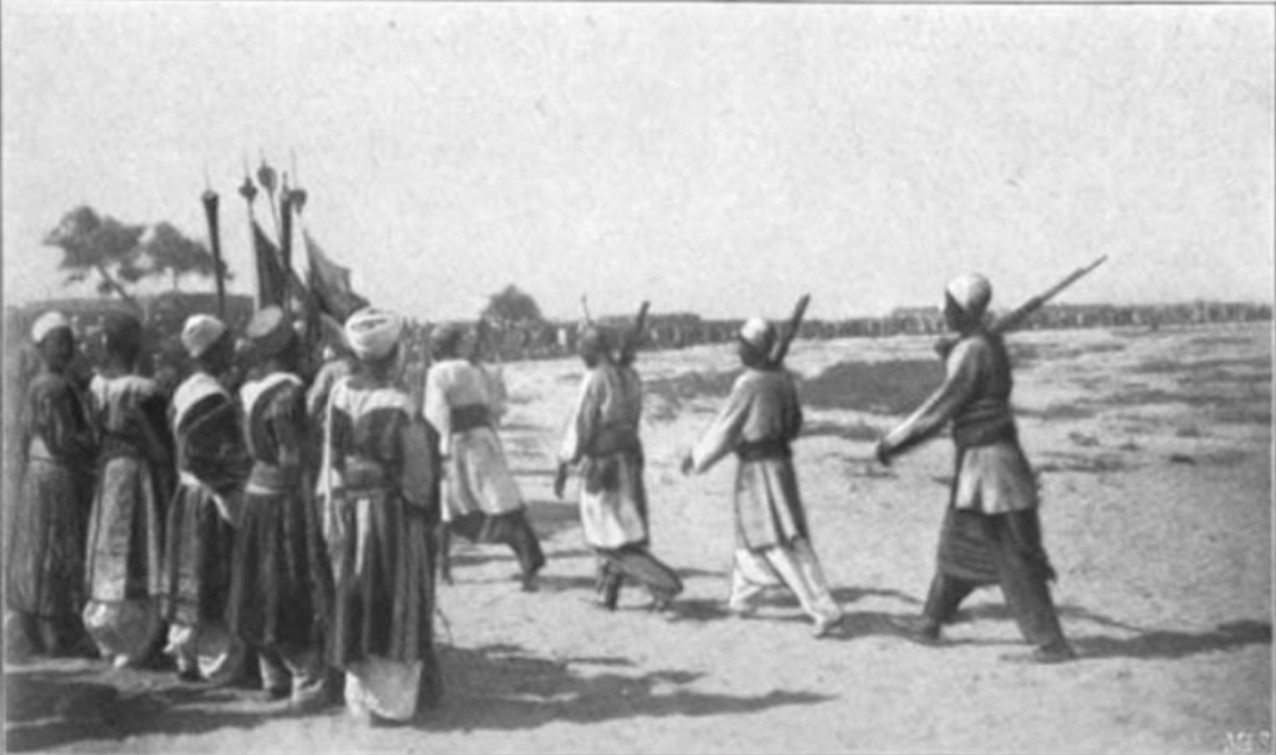
An example of Fulani Soldiers in North Kamerun

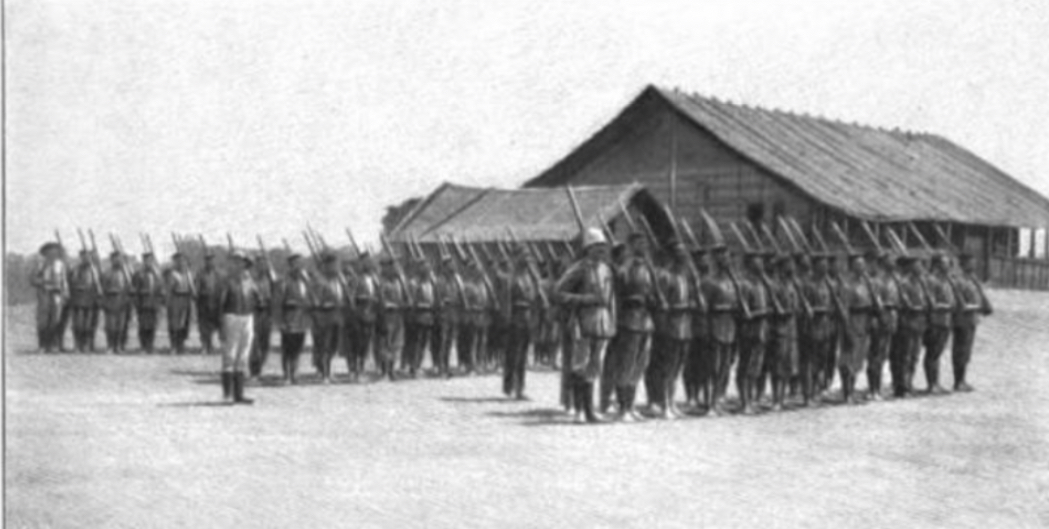
Captain Hans Dominik with a Schutztruppe company, 1906

Between 1903 and 1907, the situation had calmed in the parts of the former Sokoto Caliphate occupied by the Schutztruppe. However under German rule, Muslims saw themselves on the defensive over their religion, and a significant uprising occurred in the summer of 1907.

After a pilgrimage to Mecca, Mal Alhadji returned to northern Kamerun and, under the influence of the Mallam (Koranic theologian) Liman Arabu, began preaching the Mahdiyya throughout Adamawa. In June he started a Mahdist revolt against German rule near Maroua, claiming he had been appointed to deliver them to the Mahdi out of colonial rule and from the Muslim rulers loyal to the German Empire, installing himself at Goudoum-Goudoum, gathering forces both from the Fulani and the Shuwa Arabs in the far north. Simultaneously, Goni Waday, another Mahdist who recently travelled to Mecca, launched a revolt in Ngaoundéré having gathered support with his passionate sermons calling for a jihad from the Mosques of the city to expel the German Christians and restore the old caliphate.

Mal Alhadji moved north to defeat the Schutztruppe, burning down villages considered complicit with the Europeans along the way. In early July, the Mahdist force attacked the German camp at Malam-Petel (commanded by Capt. Zimmermann), but they were immediately met with gunfire, and after heavy losses had to retreat. Zimmermann's force pursued Alhadji, capturing him at Doumru. The Germans turned Alhadji over to the local ruler of Maroua, Lamido Soudi, and he was publicly beheaded in the Maroua market-place along with several of his accomplices. The Germans killed Mallam Arabu for playing a prominent role in Alhadji's revolt.

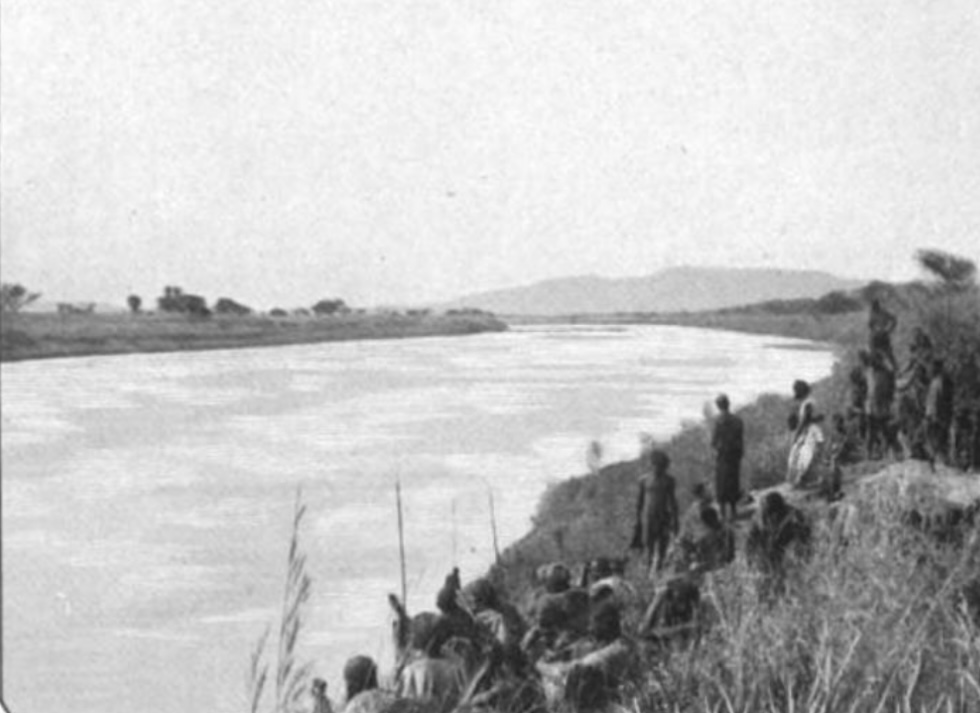
The Benue River

Meanwhile, the ruler of Ngaoundéré, worried of German retaliation, expelled Waday and his rebels from his domain. Waday and his followers decided tried to head north toward Garoua with the intention of capturing it. Crossing the Benue River to the southeast of Garoua, the Fulani force closed in. The Schutztruppe sent a force under Lt. Nitschmann to Guébaké, where on July 18, 1907, they ambushed the Fulanis marching on Garoua. Waday was raked with machinegun fire and killed, and only the rearmost Mahdists escaped the ambush. By August 1907, the rebels across north Adamawa had been suppressed, ending the uprising. To prevent similar uprisings, the Germans rounded up all of the Fulani leaders who had supported Waday and hanged them in Garoua. Because both Alhadji and Waday had recently returned from the Hajj, restrictions were put in place and pilgrimages to Mecca had to receive prior authorization.

Despite the suppression of the Mahdist Uprising, German control of Kamerun would be brought to a decisive end less than 10 years later by the French Troupes coloniales and British West African Frontier Force in the Kamerun campaign of World War I.

== Sources ==
- Martin Njeuma: The Usmanuya System, Radicalism and the Establishment of German Colonial Rule in Northern Cameroon, 1890-1907, Frobenius 1994
- Florian Hoffmann: Okkupation und Militärverwaltung in Kamerun. Etablierung und Institutionalisierung des kolonialen Gewaltmonopols 1891–1914, Göttingen 2007
- Hans Dominik: Vom Atlantik zum Tschadsee: Kriegs- und Forschungsfahrten in Kamerun, Harvard 1908
- Holger Weiss: The Illegal Trade in Slaves from German Northern Cameroon to British Northern Nigeria, Wisconsin 2000
- A. H. M. Kirk-Greene: Adamawa Past and Present: An Historical Approach to the Development of a Northern Cameroons Province, Taylor & Francis 2018
