= Biographical Dictionary of Chinese Christianity =

Biographical dictionary

- Website type: Online encyclopedia
- Editor: Global China Center
- Website: www.bdcconline.net
- Launched: June 2006; 20 years ago

The Biographical Dictionary of Chinese Christianity (BDCC) is a biographical dictionary which focuses on the lives of Chinese Christians and foreign Christian missionaries to China. It is published in both Chinese and English.

== History ==
The BDCC was initially based on the Dictionary of African Christian Biography (DACB) produced by the Boston University School of Theology, and was supported by the DACB and the Overseas Ministries Study Center. The BDCC began with already published biographical materials, especially from the Biographical Dictionary of Christian Missions (1998), and invites contributions from other researchers and institutions.

== See also ==
- Christianity in China
- Jesuit China missions
- Protestant missions in China
