= Sso (rite) =

Initiation rite once practised by the Beti of Cameroon

The Sso was an initiation rite practiced by the Beti of Cameroon in the 19th and early 20th centuries. The participants were young men between 15 and 25 years of age who, by completing the rite, became adults and enjoyed added privileges, such as passage into land of the ancestors at death. Each boy was sponsored by an esia Sso (Sso father). The sponsor of the rite was a village headman; he was expected to provide food and lodging for guests and to pay for several large feasts during the rite's six-month duration. Other important figures were the zum loa, who revealed past sins that the sponsor had committed and which would be expiated by the rite's completion, and the mfek Sso, who organised and administered the rite.

The sso candidates lived away from the sponsor's compound in a barracks called the esam Sso. The rite consisted of numerous feasts for the sponsors and elders and harrowing trials for the candidates. The boys had no instruction or supervision and relied on hunting and stealing to survive. After five months, the mfek Sso gathered the candidates around the ritual Sso tree and signalled the rite's last stages. In the final ordeal, the boys danced around their compound, were sprayed with ants or itching powder, and crawled through a tunnel from the esam Sso to the sponsor's compound. After one final hunt, the rite was completed and the boys obtained adult status.

The sso was important because it provided a means by which unrelated Beti lineages could form bonds, and, unlike with marriage, more than two lineages could participate. sso candidates bonded with one another, and the Sso sponsor bonded with the boys' fathers and sponsors. The rite held an important place in Beti religion, as it was seen as a means by which a man could gain entry into the land of the ancestors after death. For the other villagers, the Sso was a source of entertainment and an excuse to socialise in large groups. During Cameroon's colonial period, colonial authorities opposed the rite.

== Organisation and significance ==
The Sso was named for an antelope hunted by the Beti, which, according to their folklore, was extremely fast and had no need of sleep. Several headmen usually sponsored a single Sso rite, and the events occurred at their compounds. Sponsorship was expensive; it entailed providing numerous feasts, housing out-of-town guests, entertaining large groups, and recruiting certain individuals who travelled from lineage to lineage to conduct the rituals involved. Sponsorship brought great prestige for the individual and his mvog (lineage). Sponsors could generally count on the help of their kin, as they would gain some residual status just for helping. If the Sso finished successfully, the sponsor was supposed to have atoned for some past misdeed, often incest or revealing Sso secrets, that had been plaguing him and his lineage.

The young men who participated in the Sso, known as mvon, were between 15 and 25 years old. They came from miles away to participate, because by completing the rite, they would go from ebin (uninitiated) to mpangos (warrior). This granted the privileges of adult status: participation in tribal councils, the ability to eat a wider variety of meats, and perhaps most importantly, entry to the land of the ancestors after death. Three mvon had special duties. The asu zoa (elephant) was selected by the sponsor to lead the rest of the candidates. He was usually a member of the sponsor's family. A Beti proverb states, "Where the elephant has gone, there is a path for others." The dib koa (line closer) was tasked with bringing up the rear of mvon hunting parties. The asu zoa and dib koa were both expected to keep order among the candidates. The zogo (weakling) served as the ritual target of the others' jokes. The mvon were divided into several non-competing groups of as many as 60 individuals.

Each candidate had a personal esia Sso (Sso father), a man who had himself completed the rite. The esia Sso participated in all Sso-related feasts and events and helped to organise the tasks and trials the candidates would face. Participants and Sso fathers could grow very close; some esia Sso helped their mvon arrange bride prices for later marriage, and a mvon was forbidden to marry the daughter of his esia Sso, even if the two individuals were from different lineages.

Two other individuals performed important tasks. The zum loa was an orator who gave a speech at the end of the rite detailing the sponsor's sins that had required the rite to the held. His regalia included an antelope skin, iron bracelets, a red hat, and a long spear. The zum loa was renowned for his abilities as a public speaker. His prestige was such that others bowed to him, a courtesy not afforded to even village headmen. The mfek Sso (holder of the Sso sack) was responsible for the actual running of the Sso rite. His name made reference to his sack of traditional medicines that would later be eaten or drunk during the rite.

The Sso rite had great significance to Beti society. It was a sort of "school for warriors", and by completing it, a young man attained adult status. Because groups of Sso brothers came from several lineages, the participants established ties with individuals with whom they would otherwise have little interaction. In fact, marriage was the only other means of binding Beti mvog together, and it only affected two lineages. Such bonds also formed between the mvon and their Sso fathers, between the mvon and the rite's sponsor, and between the sponsor and the boys' fathers. For the villagers, the Sso was a source of amusement and an excuse to gather in large numbers and catch up with old friends.

The Sso had importance to Beti religion. It was thought that only men who had completed the ritual would be allowed into the land of the ancestors. The Beti even reckoned time in reference to the duration between Sso rites. Nevertheless, Karl Atangana, the Christian paramount chief of the Ewondo and Beti during the German colonial period, spoke out against the Sso as a pagan rite.

== Rites ==
A Sso typically began in November during the dry season and spanned about six months. The rite began with the fathers of the participants partaking of a small feast called the efeb nsen (approving the court), which allowed the sponsor to showcase his ability to provide the requisite feasts for the rest of the six-month rite. The most important opening ceremony was the ndzom Sso (cutting of the Sso tree). The elders cut down a tree and the mvon stripped it of branches. They moved it to the sponsor's compound, smoothed the trunk, and covered it in carvings of animals and guns; then they danced on the trunk. Another feast followed, during which observers sang the virtues of the Sso candidates and their families and marriages were proposed and arranged.

The trials began after the feast. The participants lived together in groups in a kind of compound known as the esam Sso. They had no supervision or instructions except that they were to refrain from sexual intercourse with the sister of a Sso brother and not to allow another to make slanderous comments about a Sso brother. They supported themselves by hunting and stealing food and livestock from the compounds. The villagers tolerated this, and the practice is remembered in the Beti saying, "to steal like a mvon". Occasionally, candidates quarrelled or fought.

The trials were designed to prove the candidates' toughness and resolve. Some of these were a kind of hazing, with tasks that varied from being sprayed with itching powder and then climbing through wet tunnels, climbing trees infested with driver ants to get at kola nuts, enduring beatings from the elders, fighting in mock battles with initiated warriors, leaping over fires, and suffering surprise attacks while on hunting trips. The death of a mvon was kept secret until the end of the rite, when the boy's parents were told that he had become one of the antelopes for which the rite was named.

After five months, the mfek Sso assembled the candidates around the Sso tree. He stood on its trunk, fired a gun, and announced that "the Sso dies in ten days." Women and children were banished from the village. The male elders then dug a tunnel or trench that led from the participants' esam Sso to one of three exits, the last of which was at the sponsor's compound. The tunnel was covered with leaves. For the final trial, the mvon danced around their esam Sso several times, and the Sso fathers ordered them into the tunnel. The elders covered the boys in ants or itching powder and instructed them to crawl until they reached the third exit; if they chose one of the earlier exits, the elders told them, an ax-wielding slave would kill them. The elders made this final ordeal more terrifying by beating drums with loosely fitted skins. Once a candidate arrived at the sponsor's compound, he climbed from the tunnel and declared, "Tara, my father, I have killed the Sso." He touched the entrance to the sponsor's abaa (compound) and rolled on the ground to soothe his itching skin.

After all the candidates had emerged, the sponsor danced and declared the transgression that had compelled him to sponsor the Sso. A goat, referred to as the Sso, was fed a plant known as an akon that covered its vocal cords and prevented it from bleating. The elders dismembered the animal limb by limb then slit its throat. If the goat made a sound, the rite was declared null and had to be redone. On the other hand, if the goat endured its death in silence, the people declared that Sso enru mbem, "the Sso is dead". The zum loa repeated the sponsor's faults and declared them atoned for. He declared that anyone who mentioned them again would be guilty as the sponsor had been before and would have to atone himself.

The mvon enjoyed more freedom of movement, but they were expected to rest in the esam Sso until they had healed from injuries. Any candidate who had shown himself exceptionally skilled at hunting or fighting, including those who had killed a fellow candidate, were allowed to leave the compound early. The boys went on a last group hunt known as the sdkulu mvon, which marked the end of the rite.
