= Council of Notables =

Type of political body

A Council of Notables (French: Conseil des notables) is a political body comprising persons of note in a community who are chosen by the governing authority in the region for their special knowledge, experience, skills, status or accomplishments. Such councils have existed in many regions and countries throughout the world. "Whether in village, province, or capital, there is, a conclave of local authorities of whose opinion the ruler — be it conqueror, governor, or sovereign — is bound to take account, though he is not bound to obey their decisions."

== History ==
On 21 May 1919, a ministerial decree in French West Africa created Councils of Notables. These Councils of Notables would be made up of traditional leaders and local elites.

== Country ==
=== French Cameroon ===
A Council of Notables was one of many political bodies established in French Cameroon between the First and Second World Wars. Each of the colony's nine administrative areas had its own Council. These local government institutions comprised the people whom the French deemed to be the elite of the region. The colonial commissioner chose the members of each council from lists supplied by local officials.

By establishing these bodies, the colonial regime hoped to reign in some of Cameroon's nationalist and pro-independence sentiment. The Councils were expected to uphold and support French policies. Other duties included acting as liaisons between the administration and local populations and alerting the regime as to the status of local projects such as tax collection and the construction of road and rail. In return, the Council members received a cut of taxes collected, exemption from some obligations, and a stipend for supervising road construction.

=== French Togoland ===
On 17 February 1922, Commissioner Auguste Bonnecarrère signed a measure adapting the Councils of Notables structure for French Togoland.

== See also ==
- Council of Elders
