= Student Switch Off =

UK collegiate energy conservation charity

- Formation: 2006
- Purpose: Carbon reduction and awareness raising of sustainability issues
- Region served: UK
- Website: www.sos-uk.org/sustainable-accommodation/

Student Switch Off is a campaign that aims to encourage students to save energy when living in University halls of residence. It is run by the Students Organising for Sustainability UK, a student-led education charity focusing on sustainability.

As of March 2022, the campaign currently runs at 18 universities across the UK. In the 2021/22 academic year it engaged over 1,500 student through online competitions, campus visits and training. In 2021, the activities resulted in over 250 tonnes of CO_{2} saved.

The scheme concentrates on behavioural change and social marketing to bring about carbon reduction.

== History ==
The campaign was set up by Dr Neil Jennings as a pilot project at the University of East Anglia in 2006. In the pilot year, the campaign helped to reduce energy usage by an average of over 10% in halls of residence, saving around 90 tonnes of CO_{2} and over £19,000 in energy expenditure. Jennings received significant support in developing the campaign from the Ben & Jerry's Climate Change College and secured sponsorship of the campaign from E.ON, Odeon Cinemas, The Independent and FirstGroup.

The campaign expanded to seven universities in 2007/08 and 11 in 2008/09 until in 2009 the Student Switch Off partnered with the National Union of Students as part of the Defra funded Degrees Cooler project, increasing the number of universities hosting the campaign by 22. Other partners included People & Planet, London Sustainability Exchange, Green Impact and Student Force for Sustainability.

In 2009, the Student Switch Off was chosen by Carbon Leapfrog as one of the projects it would support with pro-bono legal and accountancy support.

In May 2012, the campaign won an Ashden Award (described as the Oscars of the energy-saving world) and in March 2011 won the "Best Energy Saving Idea" award at the inaugural People and Environment Achievement Awards.

In 2012, ownership of the campaign was transferred to the National Union of Students and in 2014 the campaign received funding from the European Union (EU) to expand into four more European countries - Cyprus, Greece, Lithuania and Sweden.

In 2017, the campaign received additional funding from the EU to expand to Bulgaria, Ireland and Romania and to develop advice materials for students living in the private rented sector to reduce their exposure to fuel poverty.

In the academic year 2016/17, more than 26,000 students pledged their support for energy-saving in their halls of residence.

== Results ==
Year	Universities	No. of students signed up	% electricity reduction	Tonnes of CO_{2} saved	£ saved
2006-07	1	130	10%	90	£19,000
2007-08	7	2,800	8.9%	550	£100,000+
2008-09	11	4,980	9.3%	1,295	£218,000
2009-10	33	12,052	6.9%	2,100	£337,000
2010-11	37	15,351	6.9%	1,522	£232,000
2011-12	43	19,430	5.7%	1,405	£220,000
2012-13	54	22,715	5.3%	1,478	£219,000
2013-14	54	26,812	5.9%	1,606	£261,000
2014-15	48	26,274	5.8%	1,467	£269,000
2015-16	44	26,653	6.6%	1,813	£330,000
2016-17	38	26,353	5.8%	1,362	£255,000
2017-18	34	27009	6.95%	858	£175,462
2018-19	27	16911		330	£109,956
2019-20	20	12393		497	£239,939

N.B. The aggregate CO_{2} and money saving is variable between years even with a similar % reduction
because of changing prices of energy, changing carbon emissions per kWh of electricity and changing
number of months included in the analysis at different universities.

== Awards ==
The Student Switch Off has received the following awards since its inception in 2006:

- November 2008: The Green Awards. Highly commended, Best Green Campaigner
- June 2010: National eWell-Being Awards. Highly commended, energy efficiency category
- March 2011: People and Environment Achievement Awards. Winner, Best Energy Saving Idea
- March 2011: Climate Week Awards. Finalist in Best Campaign category
- May 2012: Ashden Awards Winner
