= Salford Symphony Orchestra =

Amateur orchestra in North West England

Salford Symphony Orchestra (SSO)
- Orchestra
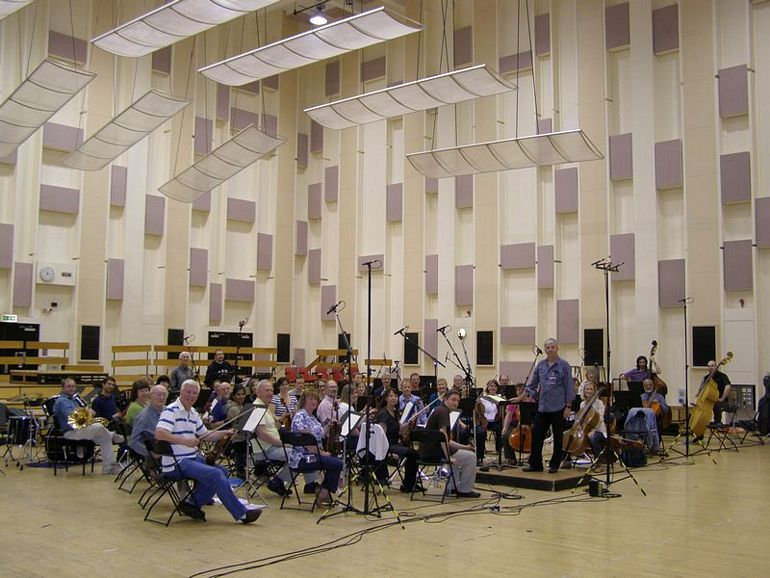
- Salford Symphony recording in BBC Studio 7, Oxford Road Manchester
- Founded: 1947
- Location: Salford, Greater Manchester, United Kingdom
- Music director: Chris Clark
- Website: www.salfordsymphony.org

The Salford Symphony Orchestra (SSO) is one of the major amateur orchestras in North West England. It is also one of the oldest, celebrating its 70th year in 2017. It is based at Salford, in Greater Manchester, England. Joseph Needham founded Salford Symphony Orchestra in 1947.

Concerts are given four times a year, usually in the Peel Hall of the University of Salford, sometimes with professional soloists. The current Musical Director is Chris Clark.
