= Dictionary of African Christian Biography =

Dictionary of Christianity in Africa

- Website type: Online encyclopedia
- Editors: Center for Global Christianity and Mission
- Website: dacb.org
- Launched: 1998

The Dictionary of African Christian Biography (DACB) is a biographical dictionary which focuses on the lives of African Christians and foreign Christian missionaries to Africa. Its biographical stories are published in English, French, Portuguese, and Swahili.

== History ==
The DACB was initially conceived in 1995 at the Overseas Ministries Study Center, then based in New Haven, Connecticut, and eventually launching in 1998.

Since 2012, it has been associated with the Center for Global Christianity and Mission at Boston University. The project has also helped to inspire the creation of the Biographical Dictionary of Chinese Christianity

In 2016 the Journal of the Dictionary of African Christian Biography began to be published quarterly.

The Advisory Council of the Dictionary of African Christian Biography started meeting annually in 2014.

== See also ==
- Christianity in Africa
