= French Colonial Conference =

The French Colonial Conference was an event held in Paris, France, in 1935.
