= Hans Dominik (Schutztruppe) =

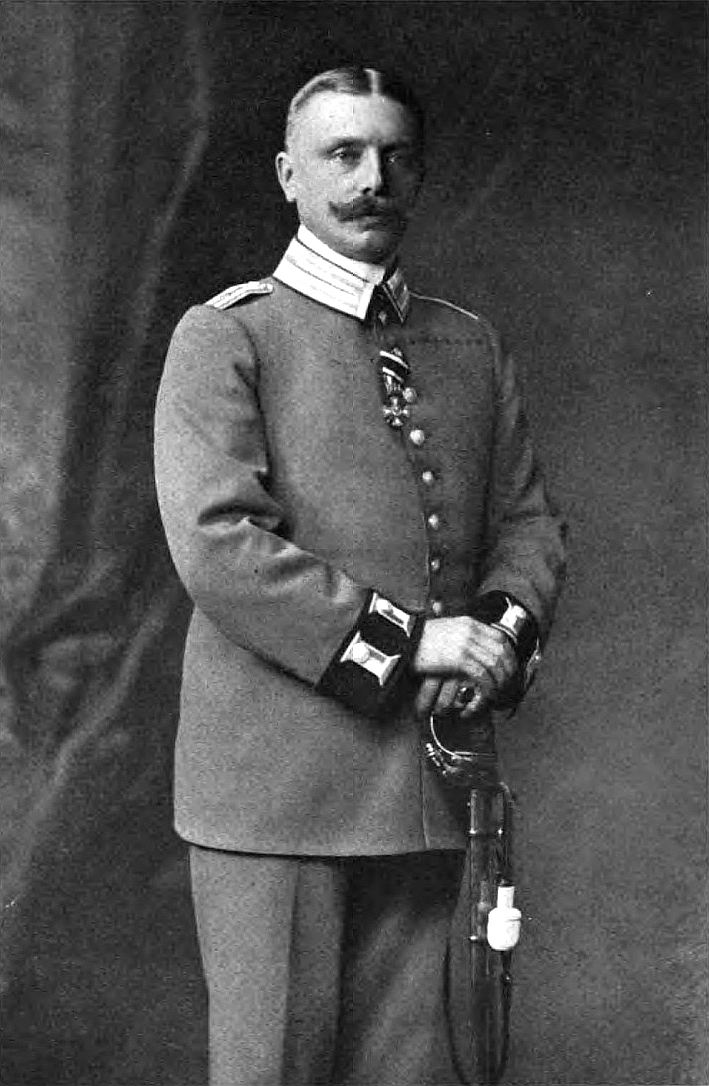
- Born: 7 May 1870; Kulm, Kingdom of Prussia
- Died: 16 December 1910 (aged 40); Atlantic Ocean
- Military career
- Allegiance: German Empire
- Branch: Imperial German Army: Schutztruppe
- Service years: 1889–1910
- Rank: Major
- Unit: 12th Grenadier Regiment
- Commands: Yaunde base
- Conflicts: Colonial conflicts: Adamawa Wars

Hans Dominik (7 May 1870 – 16 December 1910) was a German colonial officer of the Schutztruppe (the German Empire's colonial forces). He was the long-time commander of the Jaunde military station in Kamerun.

== Early life and career ==
Dominik was born in Kulm (now in Poland) and grew up in Schwedt. After finishing high school, he joined the 12th Grenadier Regiment in 1889 as a Fahnenjunker (Officer Cadet). In 1890 he was promoted to Second Lieutenant, then to First Lieutenant in 1897. In 1904 he was made Hauptmann (Captain).

Dominik became the protégé of Hauptmann Kurt von Morgen, who served in the same regiment and had undertaken two research journeys to central Cameroon in 1889 and from 1890 to 1891. When Morgen was tasked with the formation of the Kamerun Schutztruppe in 1894, Dominik was transferred to service with the Auswärtiges Amt (the German foreign ministry) as adjutant to Morgen. In Cairo, he hired Sudanese mercenaries for the new Schutztruppe and participated in the first military campaign against the Abo, northwest of the port city of Douala. In March and April 1895, several more expeditions against the Kpe at Buea, near Mount Cameroon followed. From 1896 to 1898, Dominik served as commander of Jaunde military station (present-day Yaoundé). In 1897 he was finally officially transferred to the Schutztruppe. He went on to take part in the Vute-Adamawa expedition as company leader under the leadership of the Schutztruppe's commander, Oltwig von Kamptz.

== Adamawa Wars ==
Dominik returned to Germany in 1900, leaving again the next year to serve as special envoy of the government to the Kamerun colony. He was tasked with meeting Emir Djubayru of the Fulani Adamawa Emirate, who held stewardship over the territories between the Sanaga River and Lake Chad that were claimed by the German Empire. However, plans for a peaceful solution for the conflict were ruined when Hauptmann Rudolf Cramer von Clausbruch, commander of Joko military station, ignored orders from Governor Jesko von Puttkamer and began a military occupation of Adamawa. Von Clausbruch captured Ngaoundéré in 1901 and vanquished Emir Djubayru's troops near Garoua. Dominik took over the supreme command over the German troops in Adamawa and defeated the Fulani cavalry once again at Miskin-Maroua, thereby bringing the whole of the Adamawa Plateau under German control.

== Government representative in Kamerun ==
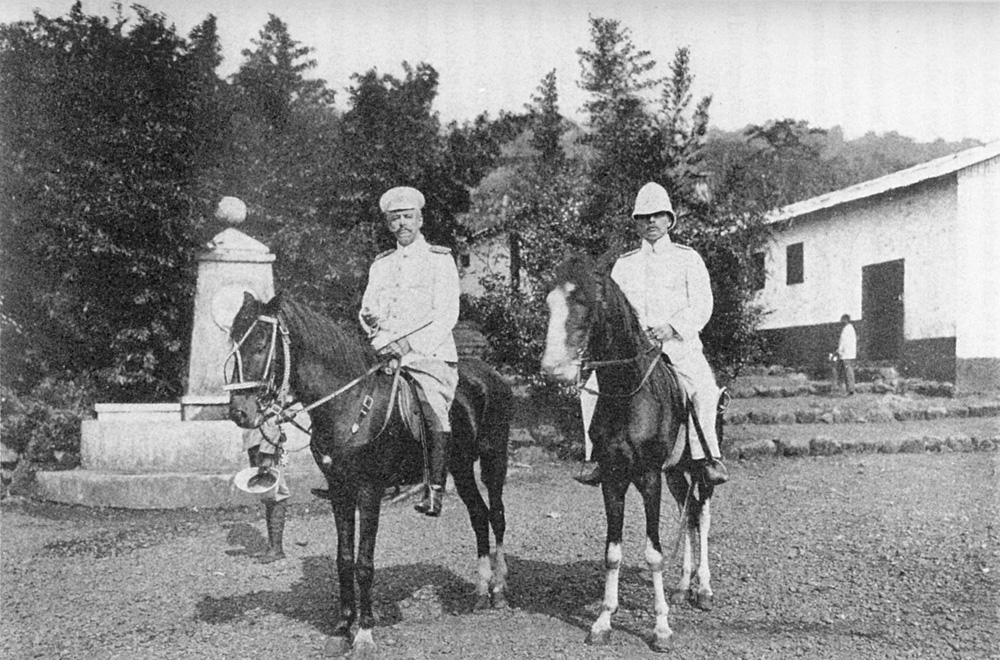
Jesko von Puttkamer and Hans Dominik at the Bismarck Fountain in Kamerun.

At first, Dominik was supposed to remain in northern Kamerun as the German government's representative. However, he was preliminarily recalled to Germany because of several charges against him. In 1903 he returned to his post as commander of Jaunde station, a post he kept until his death. In this capacity, he was responsible for the station's development. However, his position was not uncontested, as he faced hostility from civil servants and merchants as well as from fellow officers.

During his tenure at Jaunde, Dominik had to deal with unrest among the population. In 1909, the Maka of the upper Nyong River rebelled; Dominik crushed the unrest with the aid of Hauptmann Marschner from the Schutztruppe. He was criticised harshly for giving Maka women away as booty to loyal Cameroonian auxiliary troops. Dominik also led a massacre against a group of natives, who'd refused to cooperate with the Germans, at Nachtigal Falls. After killing the adults, he had the fifty-two children placed in baskets and thrown into the water. Overall, Dominik expressed racist views against the indigenous population.

"They must know that I am their master and that I am stronger, and as long as they do not believe that, they must be made to feel it, and I mean severely and pitilessly, so that rebellion will pass by them for all time."

Weakened from the strains of the campaign, Hans Dominik departed for Europe. He died at sea, shortly after his promotion to Major.

== Legacy ==
Dominik's importance for the colony's "pacification" and his status as the longest-serving officer in the Kamerun colony as well as his ability of image cultivation—he published two widely read books concerning his activities in Africa—led to the development of a kind of Dominik myth. A monument to Dominik was built in Kribi. It was later torn down by the French and transferred to Germany, after France took control of most of Germany's former colonial empire.

Despite their apologetic character, Dominik's two publications are today a valuable source of information on the history of Cameroon and its people.

== Publications ==
- Kamerun. Sechs Kriegs- und Friedensjahre in deutschen Tropen (Cameroon: Six Years of War and Peace in the German Tropics). 1901.
- Vom Atlantik zum Tschadsee. Kriegs- und Forschungsfahrten in Kamerun (From the Atlantic to Lake Chad: Journeys of War and of Research in Cameroon). 1908.

== Sources ==
- Obituary by Hans Ramsay (1910): Deutsche Kolonialzeitung 27. pp. 896–898.
- Hans v. Chamier-Glisczinski (1938): Leben und Sterben um Afrika. Leipzig. pp. 1–48.
- Erich R. Petersen (1941): Hans Dominik. Kameruns großer Soldat. Berlin (novel)
- Richard Tsogang Fossi (2023): Dominik, Friedrich Wilhelm Hans. In: Collective (ed.), Atlas de l'absence. Le patrimoine culturel du Cameroun en Allemagne , Berlin 2023, (english working translation online) Berlin, pp. 393–396.
