= Beti-Pahuin peoples =

Bantu ethnic group of Cameroon

The Beti-Pahuin are a Bantu ethnic group located in Center region of Cameroon. Though they separate themselves into several individual clans, they all share a common origin, history and culture. Estimated to be well over 8 million individuals in the early 21st century, they form the largest ethnic group in central Cameroon and its capital city of Yaounde. Their Beti languages are mutually intelligible.

== Group distinctions ==
The Beti-Pahuin are made up of over 20 individual clans. Altogether, they inhabit a territory of forests and rolling hills that stretches from the Sanaga River in the north to Equatorial Guinea and the northern halves of Gabon to Congo to the south, and from the Atlantic Ocean to the west to the Dja River in the east.

=== Beti ===
The first grouping, called the Beti, consists of the Ewondo (more precisely Kolo), Bane, Fang (more precisely M'fang), Mbida-Mbane, Mvog-Nyenge, Bran (more precisely Brang or Brong) and Eton (or Iton). The Eton are further subdivided into the Eton-Beti, Eton-Beloua, and Beloua-Eton.

The Ewondo, or Yaunde, are centered on Yaoundé, Cameroon's capital, which was named for them. They also populate the eastern Mefou division and the Mfoundi and Nyong and So divisions in the Centre Province. The remainder of their territory lies in the northern portions of the Ocean division in the South Province. Their language (or Beti dialect), also called Ewondo, is the most widely spoken of the Beti languages in Cameroon, with an estimated 1,200,000 speakers in 1982. It serves as a lingua franca in Yaoundé and much of the rest of Cameroon's Center and South Provinces.

The Eton live primarily in the Lekie division of Cameroon's Centre Province with major settlements at Sa'a and Obala. They speak the Eton language or dialect, which had 500,000 speakers in 1982.

=== Fang ===
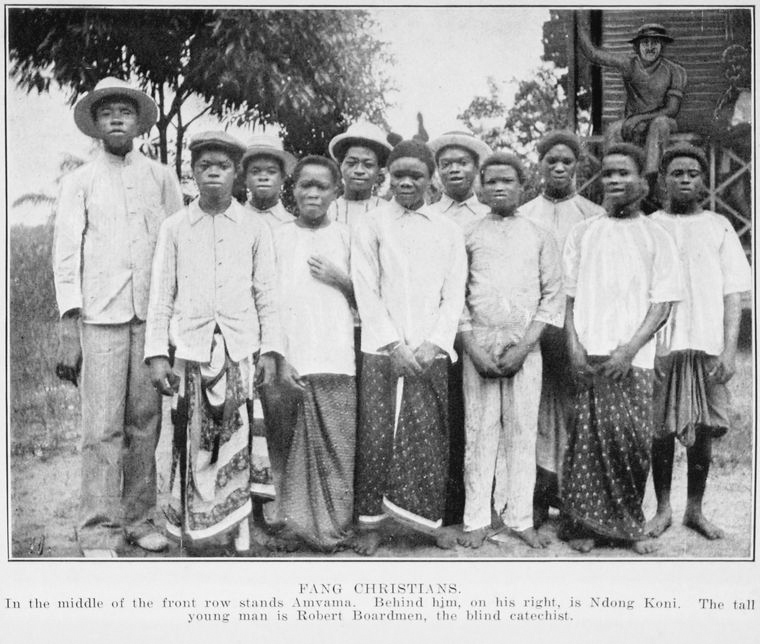
Fangs in a Christian mission, c. 1912

The Fang (or Fan) form the second group. Individual ethnic groups include the Fang proper, the Ntumu, the Mvae, and the Okak. Fang territories begin at the southern edge of Cameroon south of Kribi, Djoum, and Mvangan in the South Province and continue south across the border, including all of Río Muni in Equatorial Guinea and south into Gabon and Congo.

=== Bulu ===
The third grouping is called the Bulu and makes up about a third of all Beti-Pahuin in Cameroon. The Bulu include the Bulu proper of Sangmélima, Kribi, and Ebolowa, the Fong and Zaman of the Dja River valley, the Yengono, Yembama and Yelinda of the Nyong River valley, and the Yesum, Yebekanga, Yebekolo, and Mvele.

=== Other groups ===
In addition, several other peoples are currently being assimilated or "Pahuinised" by their Beti-Pahuin neighbours. These include the Manguissa, Yekaba, Bamvele, Evuzok, Batchanga (Tsinga), Omvang, Yetude, and, to some extent, the Baka.

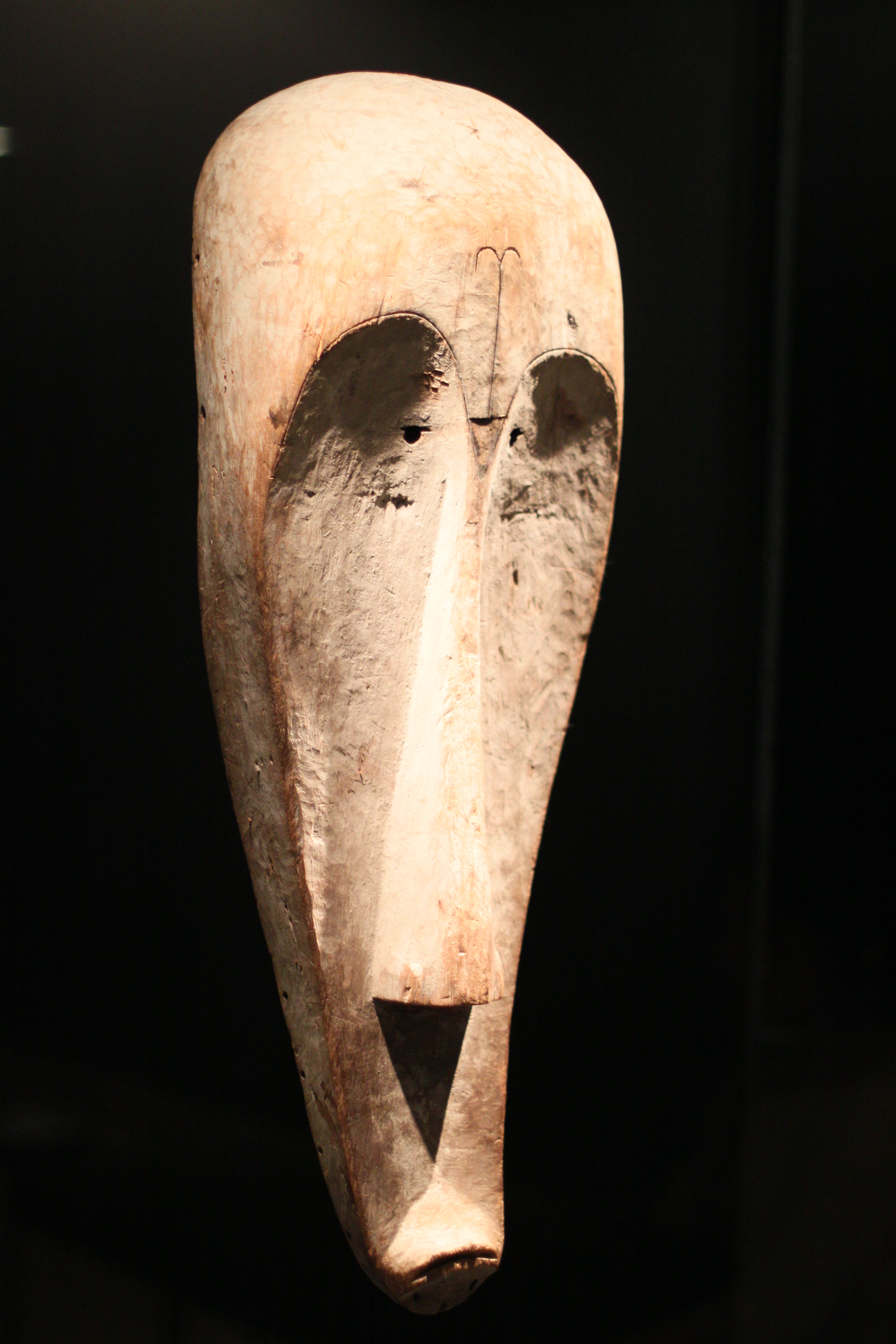
Fang mask used for the ngil ceremony, an inquisitorial search for sorcerers. Wood and pigment, 19th century. Ethnological Museum of Berlin, III C 6000.

== Society and culture ==
A large number of Beti-Pahuin are involved in lucrative enterprises such as cocoa and coffee farming.

The Beti-Pahuin peoples organised themselves according to a series of patrilineal kinships, although some of its subgroups seem to have practiced matriliny in the past. As a consequence of this matrilineal past we can still nowadays see the strong link among the maternal uncle and the nephew. The family (a man, his wife or wives, and his children) forms the backbone of this system. Several families of a common lineage live together in a village, and in turn, several related villages form a clan. These clans come under the nominal rule of a chief, who is also traditionally regarded as a religious authority.

The majority of the Beti-Pahuin ethnic groups live in small, roadside villages of no more than a few hundred inhabitants. These villages are mostly linear, with houses paralleling the road and backed by forest. The typical dwelling unit is constructed of dried-mud bricks placed onto a bamboo frame and roofed with raffia-palm fronds. In recent times, metal roofing has become increasingly common, and wealthier individuals may construct their homes in concrete.

Beti-Pahuin territory also includes a number of sizable towns and cities, most of which were begun by the Germans or French. Here, settlements are more in the European pattern, with a network of streets, various neighborhoods, and central administrative or commercial districts.

=== Diet ===
Most individuals maintain an agrarian lifestyle. Manioc and maize form the staple crops with plantains, yams, and groundnuts also playing a vital role (in fact, "Ewondo" and/or "Yaoundé" mean "groundnut" and in general the earth). A variety of forest products, such as greens, insects, mushrooms, and various palm products, supplements the diet. Livestock is limited to small animals that may be left to forage unattended, such as goats, pigs, and chickens.

These are typically saved for special occasions such as funerals or New Year's Day. Instead, the main source of animal protein during the year, comes from bushmeat, that is, wild game such as pangolin, porcupine, and monkey brought in by jungle hunters. Likewise, fishing is central to the lives of many Beti-Pahuin, particularly in Equatorial Guinea and São Tomé and Príncipe.

In addition, a substantial number of Beti-Pahuin are involved in the cocoa plantations that dot the territory of Equatorial Guinea, Gabon, and Cameroon's south. Most of these are Bulus or Fangs, since their territory contains the largest concentration of plantations. In contrast, the Ewondos farther north often find work as unskilled labor, as their environment is much more urbanized. Many Beti-Pahuin were highly skilled workers in wood, ivory, and soapstone. They were particularly noted for their lively masks.

== Religion ==
Most Beti-Pahuin peoples were Christianised by 1939 (though the Fang were also influenced by the Mitsogo). At that time, much of their traditional culture was abandoned, including much native dance and song. After the colonial era ended, their traditional religion has enjoyed a resurgence, such as the Bwiti religion and, as has a flowering of new styles of music and dance, such as the Bikutsi of the Ewondos.

Thus, today many Beti-Pahuin consider themselves Christian, go to church on Sundays, and then attend various secret societies or visit a traditional healer at other times during the week.

== Other languages ==
Some Fang peoples also speak or understand their countries’ official languages: Spanish in Equatorial Guinea; French in Cameroon, Equatorial Guinea, and Gabon; Portuguese, Angolar, Principense, and Forro in São Tomé and Príncipe, English in Cameroon.
