= Timeline of Douala =

The following is a timeline of the history of the city of Douala, Cameroon.

== Prior to 20th century ==
- 1472 - the Portuguese visit the area during the Age of Exploration
- 1845 - Alfred Saker of the British Baptist Missionary Society arrives in Douala.
- 1849 - Native Baptist Church of Douala built.
- 1859 (July 8) - Arrangement Anglo-douala signed.
- 1868 - The company Woermann-Linie in Cameroon
- 1881 - The company Woermann-Linie receives the authorization to build a factory (trading post) in Deido.
- 1884 - Germans in power (the treaty between the Douala and Germans is signed; Cameroon becomes a German protectorate.
- 1885 - Construction (1885–1890) of a prefabricate iron house for King Ndumbe Lobe.
- 1886 - The Protestant Mission of Basel takes the place of the Mission of London.
- 1887 (February) - Construction of the postoffice.
- 1888
  - (March) - Construction of a school in Joss (directed by Théodor Christaller arrived in Cameroon in 1887).
  - Construction of a brickyard (before, building materials were imported by Germans from Hamburg).
  - Fracture between the Protestant Mission of Basel and the "Natives". Construction of a new church by the natives and led by Josua Dibundu.
- 1890 - First documented plan of the city, Deutsches Kolonial Blatt.
- 1891 - German government headquarters built.
- 1893 - Revolt of the German troops composed of former slaves of Dahomey enrolled in the German army to pay back their liberation.
- 1896
  - General Hospital built.
  - The German Baptists Missioners of Berlin arrive in Cameroon.

== 20th century ==
- 1901 - "Kamerun" renamed "Duala" by decree of the Colonial Department of the Imperial Foreign Office of April 9, 1901, No. 296.
- 1905 - Palace of the Kings Bell built.
- 1906 - Mwendi Ma Musango Baptist newspaper begins publication.
- 1907 - Capital of German Cameroon relocated from Douala to Buea.
- 1908 - Elolombe Ya Cameroun Protestant newspaper begins publication.
- 1908 - Railway line sanctioned to run S.E. from Duala to the upper waters of the Nyong.
- 1909 - The railway line Bonaberi-Nkongsamba (160 km) is inaugurated.
- 1910
  - Villa Mandessi Bell (residence) built.
  - Robbery from Deutsch Westafrikanische Bank.
  - Population: 22,000.
- 1911 - The railway line Douala-Edea is inaugurated
- 1913
  - Eseka-Douala railway constructed.
  - The German urban plan is implemented by moving the population to New Deido, New Akwa and New Bell and by creating a 1 km Freie Zone to separate those areas from the European city.
- 1914
  - September: British forces in Douala.
  - New Bell established.
- 1917 (February) Louis-Ferdinand Céline is hospitalized in Douala.
- 1919 - Town becomes part of French Cameroun.
- 1921 - Capital of French Cameroun relocated from Douala to Yaounde.
- 1927 - Oryx Douala football club formed.
- 1928 - Chamber of Commerce building constructed.
- 1930 - Mbale newspaper begins publication.
- 1931
  - Palace of Justice built.
  - Catholic Apostolic Prefecture of Douala established.
- 1936 - Cathedral of Saints Peter and Paul, Douala built.
- 1941 - Radio Douala begins broadcasting.
- 1944 - Population: 37,751.
- 1945 - Riots.
- 1948 - Brasseries du Cameroun in business.
- 1949
  - Association des femmes de l'Union Francaise au Cameroun headquartered in Douala.
  - Population: 67,925.
- 1954 - Pont sur le Wouri (bridge) built to Bonabéri.
- 1955 - L'Effort Camerounais and La Presse du Cameroun newspapers begin publication.
- 1956 - Population: 124,703.
- 1957 - Union Douala football club formed.
- 1958 - Stade Akwa built.
- 1959 - 31 December: Unrest.
- 1960 - 1 January: City becomes part of the Republic of Cameroon.
- 1963 - Centre Culturel Americain active.
- 1964 - Centre Culturel Francais active.
- 1965 - Pan African Institute for Development regional headquarters established in Douala.
- 1970 - Population: 250,000 urban agglomeration.
- 1972
  - Stade de la Réunification built.
  - February–March: City hosts 1972 African Cup of Nations.
- 1974
  - Commune Urbaine de Douala (urban council) established.
  - Cameroon Tribune newspaper begins publication.
- 1978 - American School founded.
- 1979 - Le Messager newspaper begins publication.
- 1983 - Population: 708,000 urban agglomeration (estimate).
- 1986 - Musée maritime de Bonanjo (museum) founded.
- 1987 - Communauté urbaine de Douala created.
- 1990 - Population: 931,000 (urban agglomeration).
- 1991
  - General strike.
  - Doual'art (art centre) founded.
- 1992 - Commune Urbaine d`Arrondissement Douala V created.
- 1993 - University of Douala founded.
- 1997 - Commercial Bank Cameroon and Commercial Bank Group headquartered in city.
- 1999 - Festival International de Voix de Femmes begins (women's fest).
- 2000 - Population: 1,432,000 (urban agglomeration).

== 21st century ==
- 2001
  - 9 April: Political protest.
  - Douala Stock Exchange and Accueil Femmes Francophones de Douala founded.
- 2002
  - World Bank Douala Infrastructure Project launched.
  - Astres Football Club formed.
- 2004 - March: Taxi strike.
- 2005
  - City website online (approximate date).
  - Art biennale begins.
  - Population: 1,907,479.
- 2007
  - Salon Urbain de Douala (art fair) begins.
  - 5 May: Airplane crash near city.
- 2008
  - February: Anti-government protest.
  - City becomes capital of Littoral Region (Cameroon).
- 2010 - Drinking water shortage.
- 2016 - Population: 2,948,464 (estimate).
- 2019 - Part of 2019 Africa Cup of Nations football contest to be played in Douala.

== See also ==
- Douala history (fr)
- Neighborhoods of Douala
- Timeline of Yaoundé

== Bibliography ==
=== in English ===
- D. Gardinier (1969). "Urban Politics in Douala, Cameroun". African Urban Notes. 4.
- Joyce Sween; Remi Clignet (1969). "Urban Unemployment as a Determinant of Political Unrest: The Case Study of Douala, Cameroon". Canadian Journal of African Studies. 3.
- Remi Clignet; Frank Jordan (1971). "Urbanization and Social Differentiation in Africa: A Comparative Analysis of the Ecological Structures of Douala and Yaoundé". Cahiers d'Études africaines. 11 (42): 261–297. doi:10.3406/cea.1971.2803 – via Persee.fr.
- Richard A. Joseph (1974). "Settlers, Strikers and Sans-Travail: The Douala Riots of September 1945". Journal of African History. 15 (4): 669–687. doi:10.1017/S0021853700013931. JSTOR 180996. S2CID 161114929.
- Jonathan Derrick (1980). "The 'Germanophone' Elite of Douala under the French Mandate". Journal of African History. 21 (2): 255–267. doi:10.1017/S002185370001820X. JSTOR 182138. S2CID 163003718.
- Lynn Schler (2002). "Looking through a Glass of Beer: Alcohol in the Cultural Spaces of Colonial Douala, 1910-1945". International Journal of African Historical Studies. 35 (2/3): 315–334. doi:10.2307/3097616. JSTOR 3097616. PMID 17494231.
- Lynn Schler (2003). "Ambiguous Spaces: The Struggle over African Identities and Urban Communities in Colonial Douala, 1914-45". Journal of African History. 44.
- Lynn Schler (2003). "Bridewealth, Guns and Other Status Symbols: Immigration and Consumption in Colonial Douala". Journal of African Cultural Studies. 16.
- Paul Tiyambe Zeleza; Dickson Eyoh, eds. (2003). "Douala, Cameroon". Encyclopedia of Twentieth-Century African History. Routledge. ISBN 0-415-23479-4.
- Poverty and Urban Mobility in Douala, World Bank, 2004
- Abdou Maliqalim Simone (2004), "The Spectral: Assembling Douala, Cameroon", For the City Yet to Come: Changing African Life in Four Cities, Duke University Press, ISBN 978-0-8223-3434-7
- Lynn Schler (2005). "History, the Nation-State, and Alternative Narratives: An Example from Colonial Douala". African Studies Review. 48.
- Kevin Shillington, ed. (2005). "Douala". Encyclopedia of African History. Fitzroy Dearborn. ISBN 978-1-57958-245-6.
- Lucia Babina and Marilyn Douala Bell, ed. (2007). Douala in Translation: A View of the City and its Creative Transformative Potentials. Rotterdam: Episode.
- Marta Dorenda-Zaborowicz (2011). "Douala: A City of Lost Hopes? Consequences of Decolonisation in Africa Versus Sustainable Development". Problemy Ekorozwoju - Problems of Sustainable Development. 6.
- Michaela Alejandra Oberhofer (2012), "Fashioning African Cities: The Case of Johannesburg, Lagos and Douala", Streetnotes, 20 (20), doi:10.5070/S5201012052 – via California Digital Library

=== in French ===
- René Gouellain (1973). "Douala: formation et développement de la ville pendant la colonisation". Cahiers d'Études africaines (in French). 13 – via Persee.fr.
- R. Gouellain (1975). Douala: Ville et Histoire (in French). Paris: Institut d'Ethnologie, Musee de l'Homme.
- Lourdes Diaz Olvera; et al. (2010). "Quand tout ne tient qu'à un pont! Réfection d'ouvrage et dysfonctionnements urbains à Douala" [Rehabilitation of a bridge and urban dysfunction in Douala]. Belgeo (in French) (1–2): 183–196. doi:10.4000/belgeo.6763 – via Revues.org.
- Adrien Bitond (2012). "Les foyers socioculturels a Douala, 'villages en ville' ou espaces publics de proximite?". In Thomas Atenga, Georges Madib (ed.). La communication au Cameroun (in French). Archives contemporaines. ISBN 978-2-8130-0092-7.
- Collectif; Auzias, Dominique; Labourdette, Jean-Paul (2012). "Douala". Cameroun. Le Petit Futé (in French). ISBN 978-2-7469-6732-8.

=== in German ===
- Ernst Vollbehr (1912), "Duala", Mit Pinsel und Palette durch Kamerun (in German), Leipzig: List & von Bressensdorf, OCLC 9352214
- "Duala". Deutsches Kolonial-Lexikon (in German). Leipzig: Quelle & Meyer. 1920. hdl:2027/wu.89005273230.
- Andreas Eckert (1999). Grundbesitz, Landkonflikte und kolonialer Wandel: Douala 1880 bis 1960 (in German). Stuttgart: Steiner.
