= Timeline of Yaoundé =

The following is a timeline of the history of the city of Yaoundé, Cameroon.

== Prior to 20th century ==
- 1888 - "Jaunde" settlement founded by German Georg August Zenker in colonial Kamerun.
- 1895 - Trading post in business.

== 20th century ==
- 1909 - Town designated capital of German colonial Kamerun.
- 1911
  - Charles Atangana appointed mayor.
  - Palais de Charles Atangana built.
- 1916 - Town occupied by British and French forces.
- 1921 - Yaounde designated administrative seat of colonial French Cameroon.
- 1927 - Transcamerounais railway begins operating.
- 1930 - Canon Yaoundé football club formed.
- 1933 - Central Hospital of Yaoundé founded.
- 1936 - Bastos (cigarette) manufactory begins operating.
- 1939
  - Central post office built.
  - Population: 9,080.
- 1951 - Mvog-Betsi Zoo founded.
- 1952 - École professionnelle Charles-Atangana (school) built.
- 1953 - Population: 36,786.
- 1955
  - Roman Catholic Metropolitan Archdiocese of Yaoundé active.
  - Our Lady of Victories Cathedral dedicated.
- 1956 - André Fouda elected mayor.
- 1959 - École nationale d'administration et de magistrature (college) founded.
- 1961
  - City becomes capital of independent Republic of Cameroon.
  - École normale supérieure de Yaoundé (college) founded.
  - Supreme Court of Cameroon headquartered in Yaoundé.
- 1962
  - University of Yaoundé opens.
  - Population: 93,269.
- 1964 - American School of Yaounde founded.
- 1965 - University Teaching Hospital of Yaounde founded.
- 1966 - National Library of Cameroon headquartered in city.
- 1967 - Kondengui Central Prison built.
- 1971 - École nationale supérieure polytechnique de Yaoundé (college) founded.
- 1972
  - Bank of Central African States headquartered in Yaoundé.
  - Ahmadou Ahidjo Stadium opens.
  - National "centralization of government functions" leads to population increase Yaounde.
- 1973 - Monument de la réunification erected.
- 1974
  - Cameroon Tribune newspaper begins publication.
  - Tonnerre Yaoundé football club formed.
- 1976 - Population: 291,071.
- 1985 - Yaoundé General Hospital built.
- 1987
  - Cameroon Radio Television headquartered in Yaounde.
  - Population: 649,000.
- 1988 - Musée national du Cameroun (museum) active.
- 1991 - Catholic University of Central Africa opens.
- 1992 - International airport begins operating.
- 1993 - University of Yaoundé I and University of Yaoundé II established.
- 1998
  - 14 February: Yaoundé train explosion occurs.
  - Blackitude Museum founded.
  - 1,293,000 (estimate).
- 1999 - Afhemi Museum opens.

== 21st century ==
- 2002 - Yaoundé Gynaecology, Obstetrics and Pediatrics Hospital opens.
- 2004 - United Nations Development Fund for Women regional office headquartered in Yaounde.
- 2005 - Population: 1,817,524.
- 2006 - Basilique Marie-Reine-des-Apôtres (church) dedicated.
- 2008 - February: 2008 Cameroonian anti-government protests; crackdown.
- 2009
  - March: Catholic pope visits city.
  - Yaoundé Multipurpose Sports Complex opens.
- 2016
  - Paul Biya Stadium construction begins.
  - Population: 2,873,567 (estimate).
- 2019 - Part of 2019 Africa Cup of Nations football contest to be held in city.

== See also ==
- Yaoundé history
- Timeline of Douala

== Bibliography ==
in English

- Remi Clignet; Frank Jordan (1971). "Urbanization and Social Differentiation in Africa: A Comparative Analysis of the Ecological Structures of Douala and Yaoundé". Cahiers d'Études africaines. 11 (42): 261–297. doi:10.3406/cea.1971.2803 – via Persee.fr.
- Jane I. Guyer, ed. (1987). "Feeding Yaoundé, capital of Cameroon". In Feeding African Cities: Studies in Regional Social History. Indiana University Press. ISBN 0253321026.
- Paul Tiyambe Zeleza; Dickson Eyoh, eds. (2003). "Yaoundé, Cameroon". Encyclopedia of Twentieth-Century African History. Routledge. ISBN 0415234794.
- Andreas Eckert [in German] (2005). "Yaoundé". In Kevin Shillington (ed.). Encyclopedia of African History. Fitzroy Dearborn. ISBN 978-1-57958-245-6.
- Kwame Anthony Appiah; Henry Louis Gates, eds. (2005). "Yaoundé, Cameroon". Africana: The Encyclopedia of the African and African American Experience (2nd ed.). Oxford University Press. ISBN 978-0-19-517055-9.
- Gordon Prain; et al., eds. (2010). African Urban Harvest: Agriculture in the Cities of Cameroon, Kenya and Uganda. Springer. ISBN 978-1-4419-6249-2. (Includes articles about Yaoundé)
- Roman A. Cybriwsky (2013). "Yaoundé". Capital Cities around the World: An Encyclopedia of Geography, History, and Culture. ABC-CLIO. p. 342+. ISBN 978-1-61069-248-9.

in French

- André Franqueville (1968). "Le paysage urbain de Yaounde". Cahiers d'Outre-Mer (in French). 21 – via Persee.fr.
- Louis Roussel; et al. (1968). "La mobilité de la population urbaine en Afrique Noire: Deux essais de mesure, Abidjan et Yaoundé". Population (in French). 23 (2): 333–352. doi:10.2307/1527492. ISSN 1957-7966. JSTOR 1527492 – via Persee.fr.
- André Franqueville (1984). Yaoundé: construire une capitale (in French). IRD Editions. ISBN 9782709907248. (Includes bibliography)
- Anne Sidonie Zoa (1995), Les ordures à Yaoundé. Urbanisation, environnement et politique au Cameroun (in French), L'Harmattan
- Marie Morelle (2006). "'La rue' dans la ville africaine (Yaoundé, Cameroun et Antananarivo, Madagascar" [City streets in Africa]. Annales de géographie (in French). 115. doi:10.3406/geo.2006.21445 – via Persee.fr.
- J.R. Ngambi et al., 2011, "La prolifération des décharges sauvages et leurs impacts socio-environnementaux dans la ville de Yaoundé", International Journal Advanced Studies and Research in Africa, 2011 Vol.2, N°1, 52-58.
- René Joly Assako Assako (2012). "À propos de l'opération d'embellissement de Yaoundé, capitale d'Afrique centrale" [Politics of embellishment of the Cameroon capital, Yaoundé]. Cahiers d'Outre-Mer (in French). 65 (259): 371–393. doi:10.4000/com.6652 – via Revues.org.
- Jules Raymond Ngambi (2016). "Les pratiques populaires à la rescousse de la salubrité urbaine: la précollecte, un service alternatif aux insuffisances du système formel de gestion des déchets à Yaoundé". Cybergeo (in French) (789). doi:10.4000/cybergeo.27782 – via Revues.org.

in German

- "Jaunde". Deutsches Kolonial-Lexikon (in German). 1920 – via Universitätsbibliothek Frankfurt.
