= List of newspapers in Cameroon =

This is an incomplete list of newspapers published in Cameroon.

== Newspapers ==
- Cameroun Express
- Cameroon Tribune
- L'Expression de Mamy-Wata
- Le Messager
- Cameroon News Today - CNT
- Le Popoli
- La Nouvelle
- Sans Détour
- Front Hebdo
- La Nouvelle Vision
- Dikalo
- Ouest Littoral
- L'Actu
- Le Jour
- Ouest Echos
- The Median
- The Recorder
- Le Zénith
- La Météo
- Le Témoin
- Le Messager
- L'Oeil du Sahel
- Mutations
- Repères
- Le Financier d'Afrique
- The Herald Tribune
- La Voix du Centre
- Business in Cameroon
- Municipal UPDATES Daily
- The Chronicle Times
- NewsWatch
- The Watchdog Tribune
- The Nation
- The Voice
- The Post
- Cameroon News Agency
- Africulture
- Bakwa Magazine
- Actu Cameroun
- The Guardian Post
- Journal du Cameroun
- La Nouvelle Expression
- Eden Newspaper
- The Sun Newspaper
- The Times of Cameroon
- News du Cameroun

== See also ==
- Media of Cameroon
