= List of museums in Cameroon =

This is a list of museums in Cameroon.

== Museums in Cameroon ==
- artBakery, near Douala
- Babungo Museum, Ndop
- Baham Museum
- Bandjoun Museum
- Blackitude Museum, Yaoundé
- doual'art
- Mankon Museum
- Mus'art Gallery, Kumbo
- Musée Afhemi, Yaoundé
- Musée des civilisations de Dschang
- Musée maritime de Bonanjo, Douala
- Musée national du Cameroun, Yaoundé
- Petit Musée d’Art Camerounais, Yaoundé

== See also ==
- List of museums
