= Telecommunications Regulatory Board Cameroon =

Cameroonian government telecommunications regulatory body

Telecommunication Regulatory Board (Cameroon)
- Agence de Régulation des Télécommunications (ART)

Agency overview
- Formed: 1999
- Jurisdiction: Government of Cameroon
- Headquarters: Nouvelle Route Bastos, Yaoundé, Cameroon
- Motto: Regulating is Facilitating
- Agency executive: Philemon Zo'o Zame, Director General
- Parent agency: Ministry of Posts and Telecommunications (Cameroon)
- Website: https://www.art.cm/en

The Telecommunications Regulatory Board (French: Agence de Régulation des Télécommunications; ART) is a public administrative body responsible for regulating electronic communications in Cameroon. It is headquartered in Yaoundé, it operates with legal personality and financial autonomy under the supervision of the Ministry of Posts and Telecommunications (MINPOSTEL).

== History ==
ART was created in 1999, with Jean-Louis Beh Mengue serving as its first Director General for 18 years. Its creation and mandate became formal under Law No. 2010/013 of 2010, which governs electronic communications in Cameroon. The agency's internal organization and operations are further defined by Decree No. 2012/203 of 2012 on the Organization and Functioning of the Telecommunications Regulatory Agency.

In June 2017, President Paul Biya appointed Philemon Zo'o Zame as the new Director General, replacing Beh Mengue. In 2023, ART headquarters building named the Platinum Building was unveiled in Yaoundé.The unveiling ceremony was attended by Prime Minister Joseph Dion Ngute.

== Mandate ==
The primary responsibility of the agency is to oversee and regulates the activities of the telecommunication industry ensuring compliance with the country's laws, regulations and standards. Its missions include

- To ensure compliance with telecommunications laws and regulation.
- Promoting fair competitions among telecommunications operators.
- Monitoring quality of service provided by telecommunication operator.
- Penalties for breach of obligations.
- Protecting consumers interest in telecommunications.

issuing receipts of declaration. The agency supervises major telecommunications operators like MTN Cameroon, Camtel, Orange Cameroon and Viettel Cameroon

== See also ==
- Telecommunications in Cameroon
- Camtel
- MTN Group
- Orange Group
