= Wata =

WATA is a radio station in Boone, North Carolina, United States

WATA or Wata may also refer to:

- A. A. Bere Tallo Airport (ICAO code: WATA), an airport in Atambua, East Nusa Tenggara, Indonesia
- Mami Wata, a water spirit venerated in West, Central, and Southern Africa
- Wata Games, a grading authority in the field of video game collecting
- Williamsburg Area Transit Authority, a multi-jurisdiction transportation agency

== People ==
- Anna van Gogh-Kaulbach (1869-1960; also Wata), Dutch writer and translator
- Eddy Wata (born 1976), Nigerian Eurodance artist
- Wata, member of the Japanese experimental music band Boris

== See also ==
- L'Expression de Mamy-Wata (often Mamy-Wata), a weekly satirical newspaper published in Cameroon
