= Freedom of Speech in Cameroon =

Although Cameroon has a large and diverse media landscape, with more than 600 newspapers, 200 radio stations, and 60 television stations, press freedom remains significantly constrained in practice. Journalists routinely face censorship, harassment, arbitrary detention, and even death for reporting on topics deemed sensitive or critical of the government. This article outlines the legal and historical framework, censorship, harassment, and attacks on journalists, press censorship ahead of the election, and international reactions and criticism.

== Legal and historical framework ==
The Constitution of Cameroon guarantees freedom of the press by affirming the right to the freedoms listed in the Universal Declaration of Human Rights, the United Nations Charter, and the African Charter on Human and Peoples' Rights.

Despite the freedom of the press being established in the constitution, post-independence Cameroon saw many attempts to restrict the press. President Amadou Ahidjo, who was in power from 1960–1982, issued laws that restricted the freedom of the media by giving the Minister of Interior the right to seize newspapers, accredit journalists, and prohibit the distribution of printed materials from abroad. Ahidjo also passed a law in 1962 that made it illegal for anyone who "publishes or reproduces any false statement, rumor, or report or any tendentious comment or any statement or report which is likely to bring into hatred, contempt or ridicule of any public authority." The offenses outlined by the law were punishable by a fine ranging from 2,000 to 2 million francs, imprisonment from one to five years, or both. Another law passed in 1967 required all independent newspapers to submit their publications to the government for censorship before they were released to the public.

President Paul Biya took office in 1982 and promised to encourage the freedom of speech by relaxing press censorship. This led to the establishment of over a dozen new independent newspapers and the approval of the distribution of foreign publications. Despite the improvements under Biya, he still maintained some of the restrictions of his predecessor, which ensured he could censor any media that he found to be too critical or unwarranted.

In 1990, Cameroon enacted new legislation to liberalize the press and alleviate censorship. The law expanded the freedom of the press because it simplified the administrative and financial requirements previously in place for those looking to create a press organ. Despite the positive changes brought about by the 1990 law, it has also been criticized as an attempt to regulate the media, with 35 of the 90 articles imposing sanctions on the media. These sanctions include granting authorities the right to deny journalists access to administrative documents and the repeated seizure and ban of newspapers. The law also requires publications to submit their work to be censored by the state before being released to the public.

In 2014, an anti-terrorism law was passed to counter the rising threat of Boko Haram. However, according to a 2021 study, "it is a law put in place for a perfect muzzling of the press in Cameroon." The study also states that the legislation "has seriously influenced the way journalists investigate, gather, and present news stories." The law has been used to target journalists who report on sensitive or political issues, effectively criminalizing legitimate journalistic work. Reporters now face the threat of arrest or harassment under the pretense of national security. The law is used "to suppress criticism and freedom of expression by arresting journalists and activists in connection with the ongoing crisis in the Anglophone regions," according to the United States Department of State. This law is still in place in 2025.

== Censorship, harassment, and attacks on journalists ==
The severity of government censorship has varied throughout history but has generally prevented opposition viewpoints from appearing in print. Reporters Against Borders published a statement stating that due to the repressive nature of Cameroon's relationship with the press, "it is impossible for a media outlet to adopt a critical and independent editorial policy without being exposed to significant threats and harassment if its reporting endangers the interests of the government and its representatives."

=== Censorship ===
Journalist censorship and harassment are common, and there have been multiple attacks on the independent press in Cameroon. Following the 1990 legislation, the government began cracking down on independent newspapers by confiscating their publications. The independent newspaper Le Messager was frequently confiscated and eventually banned, along with five other publications: Le Messager, La Vision, Galaxie, La Nouvelle Expression, and Challenge Hebdo.

According to a 2017 study, censorship also occurs though the government not returning calls when information is requested, long wait times during appointments, refusing to start press conferences when state-sponsored media is not present, and intimidation.

The study also found that out of 172 Cameroonian journalists, 91% believe they lack press freedom and face government censorship. Additionally, 83% of respondents believe Cameroon lacks freedom of information laws.

A 2023 study also found that 55.4% of Cameroonian journalists believe the government controls media content. It concluded that journalists and publications self-censor in the fear of harassment and intimidation.

=== Harassment and attacks on journalists ===
Journalists' safety has also been under attack in Cameroon. Verbal or physical attacks, arrests and detentions, kidnappings, and the risk of murder are looming threats journalists face, according to Reporters Without Borders.

In 2023, the journalist Martinez Zogo was kidnapped and murdered due to his reporting. Zogo hosted the popular radio show "Embouteillage" and was outspoken in his criticism of Cameroon's government. As of 2023, seventeen suspects were on trial for being in connection to his murder, including high-ranking officers in Cameroon's state security agencies.

Journalists are also frequently arrested in Cameroon for their reporting. In February 2011, the editor of La Boussole, Raphaël Nkamtcheun, was arrested after being accused of receiving confidential government documents during an interview with the former finance minister Polycarpe Abah Abah. Nkamtcheun was visiting Abah in a Yaoundé prison when the arrest occurred. Reporters Without Borders condemned the incident as "an arbitrary act designed to silence the press." They argued that it is standard and legal for journalists to receive documents during prison interviews.

Cameroun Express editor Ngota Ngota Germain was also arbitrarily arrested in 2008 after allegedly falsifying a government document. Germain died in Yaoundé's Kondengui Central Prison on April 22, 2011; an incident opponents cite as government intimidation; other reporters subjected to arrest and incarceration without being charged include editors Serge Sabouang of the bimonthly La Nation and Robert Mintya of the weekly Le Devoir.

In November 2018, journalist Mimi Mefo Takambou was detained and charged with spreading fake news, endangering state security, and terrorism for her reporting on the death of a United States missionary, Charles Trumann, who was shot to death by soldiers. Her charges were dropped two days later after local and international media campaign groups called for her release.

== Press censorship ahead of the 2025 election ==
Although it has not been officially scheduled, the next presidential election in Cameroon is expected to be in October 2025. According to the Committee to Protect Journalists (CPJ), Cameroon is increasing press censorship ahead of the election.

Government pressure on independent media has intensified in the months leading up to the election. Équinoxe TV’s political talk show Droit de Réponse returned to air in October 2024 after a one-month suspension by the National Communication Council, which claimed the show harmed the reputations of two government ministers. Its replacement show was also quickly banned. The program’s host and other political journalists from the station reported receiving death threats and said they feared arrest or worse.

This wave of censorship coincides with mounting concerns about the potential re-election of President Paul Biya, 91, who has ruled Cameroon since 1982 and could seek another seven-year term.

The government has escalated retaliation against journalists with the upcoming election. In August 2024 alone, multiple suspensions were ordered against newspapers and radio stations, including RIS Radio and Première Heure, while reporters like Emmanuel Ekouli and Stéphane Nguema Zambo were physically attacked or arrested. Former state media executive Amadou Vamoulké was sentenced to an additional 20 years in prison, continuing what CPJ sees as retaliation for resisting political interference.

Press unions and freedom advocates describe the current environment as the most repressive in years, with widespread self-censorship and professional risks for journalists who challenge the state.

== International reactions and criticism ==
Reporters Without Borders' 2025 World Press Freedom Index ranked Cameroon 131st out of 180 countries.

Freedom House has classified Cameroon as "not free" every year since 1977.

In a joint report submitted ahead of Cameroon’s UN Universal Periodic Review, Freedom House, CPJ, and the ABA revealed a pattern of violence, censorship, and arbitrary detention targeting journalists, especially those reporting on the Anglophone conflict. The report condemns the Cameroonian government’s use of anti-state laws and military courts to silence the press and calls for urgent reforms to protect media freedom and uphold human rights.

== See also ==
- Internet censorship and surveillance in Cameroon
