= Mass media in Cameroon =

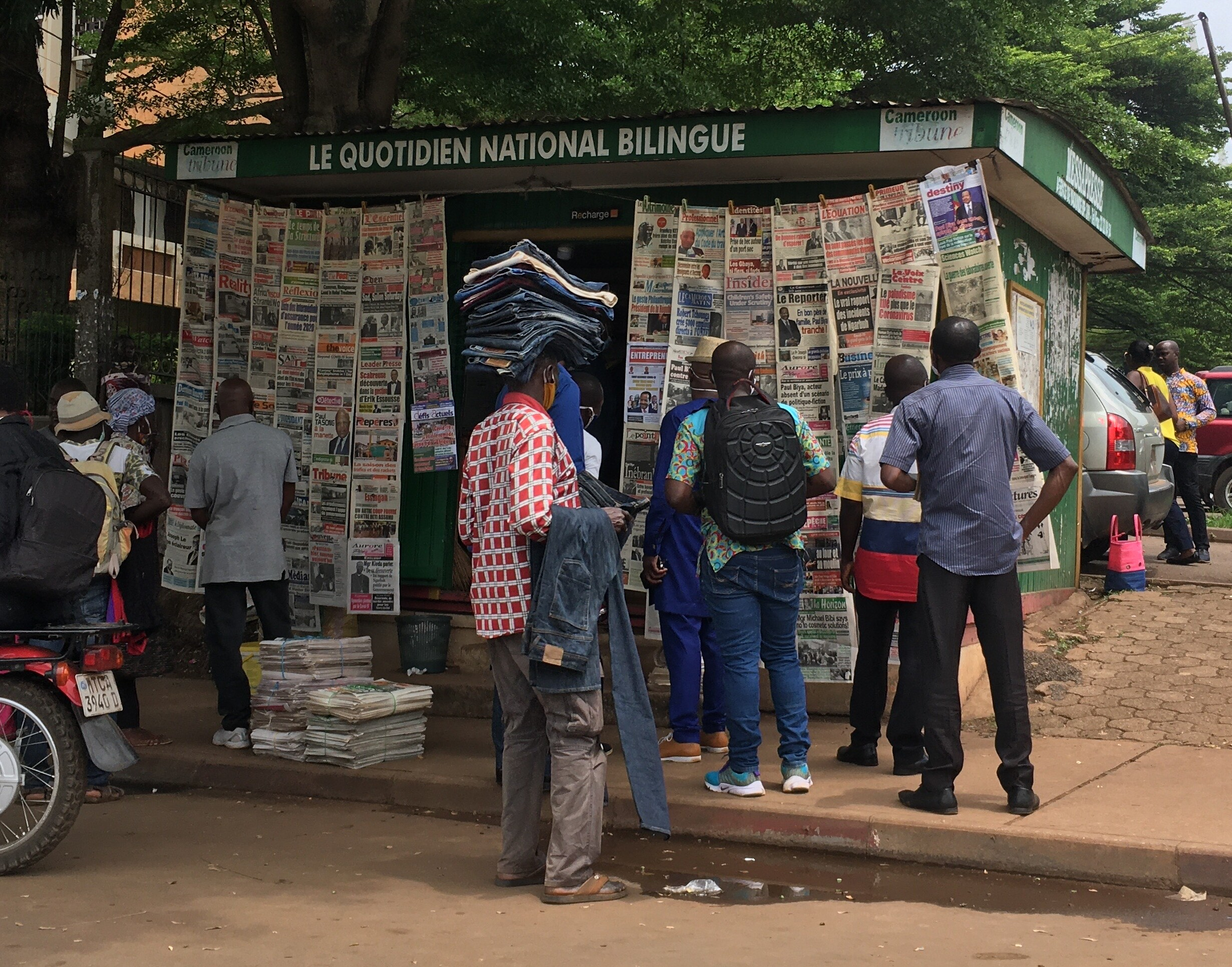
Newspaper stand in Yaoundé in 2020

The mass media in Cameroon includes independent outlets. The nation has only one national newspaper, which is state owned.

Cameroon's media includes print publications that are both public and privately owned; a public television station and privately owned channels; radio stations that are public, privately owned, and foreign; and the Internet.

== Print media ==
=== History ===
In the early's 1900s, European religious missions released the first newspapers in what is now Cameroon, including Mulee-Ngea in 1903 (by the Evangelical missionaries in Buea), Mwendi wa Musango in 1906 (by the Baptists in Douala) and Elolombe Ya Kamerun in 1908 (by the Protestant missionaries). They were written primarily in native languages and their main purpose was to teach norms and values of the "new civilization". Opposition press appeared during the French Colonial period, in the 1920s, written by Cameroonians criticizing European colonization. Some of them were written and printed outside of Cameroon, such as Mbale ("The Truth"), which was produced in France. Due to their critics of French colonization, Mbale was shut down after three issues in 1929. From 1945 to 1959, nationalist spirit and press freedom in Cameroon allowed the emergence of political newspapers, most of them attached to a political party. Most writers in this period weren't journalists and influencing public opinion was the main goal.

After independence, the opposition press lost influence and pro-government and neutral media appeared, such as Le Press du Cameroun. In June 1962, several journalists were arrested in a policy known as the "law of silence". However, no legal changes were implemented until 1966, when the law of liberty of the press was changed requiring editors to give copies of their final proofs to the office of the Minister of Territorial Administration (MINAT) and the local prefect four hours before publication or distribution. MINAT was allowed to censor each issue. After the change in the law, the number of newspapers was reduced from 30 to 9 in the following five years.

The 1970s were the low point of Cameroon journalism. Most newspapers avoided political topics and were focused on sports. No new publications appeared until 1974, when the government created the Societé de Presse et d'Editions du Cameroun (SOPECAM), and released Cameroon Tribune. In 1982, Paul Biya replaced Ahamadou Ahidjo as President of Cameroon. The transition period renewed interest in political issues due to Biya's democratization program "Le Renouveau" (New Deal), and new independent newspapers surged. However, the press law of 1966 remained until December 1990. A new law concerning the print media reaffirmed press freedom but maintained some restrictions. After this reform, editors were not required to get authorization before the publication of newspapers. Censors decisions could be appealed to a judge.

=== Current print media ===
Cameroon's print media includes several publications, including the following:

==== Public ====
- Journal officiel de la République du Cameroun: announces the publication of laws
- Cameroon Tribune: official national daily, published bilingually in French and English

==== Privately owned ====
- Cameroon Weekly: weekly best selling private newspaper
- Le Messager
- Mutations
- La Nouvelle Expression: includes an online edition
- The Herald: English, includes an online edition
- The Post: English, includes an online edition
- Le Popoli: humour newspaper
- La Voix du paysan
- La Nouvelle Tribune: weekly, economic and financial news
- Le Jour
- Dikalo
- Eden Newspaper
- Guardian Post
- The Star Newspaper
- The Sun Newspaper
- The Rambler Newspaper

== Radio and television ==
=== Television ===
Television first came to Cameroon in 1985 (relatively late, if compared to other African countries). It arrived as part of the development and modernization project of the President Paul Biya, who saw it as a mean of education for the youths, as he stated in his political manifesto Pour le libéralisme communautaire (1987). For the construction of the television centre at Mballa II and the training centre at Ekounou in Yaounde were invested ninety billion francs CFA and antennas and repeater stations were built in different strategic sites to assure decent coverage by television signals all around the country. The first broadcast was in 1985, in Bamenda, in occasion of the congress of the single party, in which the Cameroonian National Union became the Cameroon People’s Democratic Party. Until the end of the 1990s there was only one official television channel, which was the state-owned CRTV. While Paul Biya and its entourage presented television as a mean of development, many others saw it as a propaganda tool in the hand of the regime to tendentiously inform the population, praise the government, and denigrate its opponents.

Beyond news and political event coverage, in the 1980s and 1990s, CRTV produced good quality TV series with the aim to entertain and educate the Cameroonian public, against a perceived moral decadence. The most famous productions among the viewers were L'orphelin (1988–1989, dir. Ndamba Eboa) and Le débrouillard (1989–1990, dir. Ndamba Eboa), the misadventure of an orphan who suffers victimization by his stepmother, La succession de Wabo Defo (1986, dir. Daouda Mouchangou), a semi-documentary telefilm on the funeral and successor ceremonies in a bamileke chiefdom, Kabiyene ou à qui la faute? (1987, dir. Ndamba Eboa), the story of a village girl who is beaten hard by the city life, and L'étoile de Noudi (1989, dir. Daouda Mouchangou), the story of a young girl who escapes from an arranged marriage with an old village chief and becomes a prostitute in the city. In addition to these successful telefilms, CRTV produced many other low quality TV series, which remained almost unnoticed among the public, docu-fictions with a declared didactic purpose, in collaboration with the Catholic church and NGOs, and adaptations of theatrical performances. The rest of the airtime was dedicated to European sport, South-American telenovelas, Hollywood and French films downloaded from TV5 Monde, Canal France International, and Canal Plus. Most of these programs were in French, although Cameroon is a bilingual country, with both English and French as official languages.

In addition to CRTV, other private TV channels were broadcasting illegally, before the media liberalization. The best known was TV Max, finally forced to close down after a legal queerly with CRTV, at the beginning of the 2000s. In December 1990 the law n° 90/052 on social communication authorized the opening of private media, but private radio and television broadcasting was allowed only in April 2000, following the decree n° 2000/158. The liberalization of the audio-visual sector led to the mushrooming of private television stations in the main cities of the country, which tried to beat the competition of state television with programs more attuned to the interests and needs of the population. The local viewers welcomed this change and new television stations, such as Canal 2 International, Equinoxe television, and STV, have quickly become the most appreciated by the public.

Even in the new liberalized media environment, government maintains tight control over television, by the institutionalization of a broadcasting license for audiovisual exploitation. According to the article 15 of the April 2000 decree, commercial television stations must pay 100 million francs CFA ($192,000) to get a ten-year license by the Minister of Communication. Considering that the amount is huge when compared to the economic level of the country, the authorities created the so-called principle of “administrative tolerance”, which enabled media entrepreneurs to run their television stations before being fully licensed. Being this a discretional principle, media operators work under threat, as it is sufficient to make a reportage that the authorities do not like to be shut down for illegal exercise of the profession. A case in point is Equinoxe television, banned for several months in 2008, after taking position against the change of the constitution promoted by President Paul Biya.

It is estimated that CRTV covers 60% of the country through 64 transmitters. Since 2001 it has also offered satellite transmission. Private TV stations have their own transmitters. Both STV and Canal 2 International are received in the Southern half of Cameroon and are available over satellite and cable bouquets elsewhere. The only Cameroonian cable distribution enterprise is TV+, owned by Emmanuel Chatue, who also runs the television station Canal 2 International. TV+ sells images which are broadcast by foreign television channels to Cameroonian consumers, especially western movies and soap-operas. However, there are many other abusive small cable distributors who illegally distribute foreign images for very cheap fees. In addition, many of them run abusive TV channels that broadcast global media products acquired mainly through illegal internet download.

==== Public ====
- CRTV Télé: maintains a website

==== Privately owned ====
- STV1 (spectrum TV 1)
- STV 2 (Spectrum TV 2)
- Canal 2 International
- Ariane TV
- Equinox TV
- TV Max
- Kopra TV, channel under development
- DBS, channel under development
- Vision 4, in the testing phase
- New TV, under development
- Africa TV, under development
- L.T.M TV Douala
- canal2 zebra
- SAMBA TV
- T.L under development
- CAMNEWS24 Douala
- Liberty TV (Douala)
- KCBS Television (Kumba)
- cam 1 tv (limbe)
- PSTV (PEFSCOM TELEVISION) (buea)
- HiTv(Buea)
- RTV Evangelium Archdiocese of Bamenda

=== Radio ===
==== Public ====
Cameroon has several public radio stations, regulated by the Radio de l'office national de radio et télévision (CRTV).

- The national station, transmitting from Yaoundé
- Ten provincial radio stations

==== Privately owned ====
- Radio Jeunesse, Yaoundé
- RTS (Radio Tiemeni Siantou), has a website, Yaoundé and Bafang
- Magic FM, Yaoundé
- TBC, Yaoundé
- FM 94 Yaoundé
- Radio Venus, Yaoundé
- Radio Environnement, Yaoundé
- Radio Lumière, Yaoundé
- Sky One Radio, Yaoundé
- Radio Bonne Nouvelle, Yaoundé
- Moov Radio, Yaoundé
- Radio Equinoxe, has a website, Douala
- Sweet FM, Douala
- FM Suellaba (known mainly be the name FM 105), Douala
- Radio Nostalgie, Douala
- RTM (Real Time Radio), Douala
- Radio Veritas, Douala
- FM Medumba, Bangangté
- Radio Yemba, Dschang
- Radio Star FM, Bafoussam
- Radio Batcham, Bafoussam
- Radio Salaaman, Garoua
- FM Mont Cameroun Buea
- CBS Radio, Buea
- MediaAfrique Radio, Buea
- Dream FM, Buea
- Revival Gospel Radio, Buea
- Radio Bonakanda, Buea
- Radio Fotouni, Fotouni
- FM Pouala Bafoussam
- Eden Radio FM (Limbe)
- Ocean City Radio (Limbe)
- Eternity Gospel Radio (Limbe)
- Radio Oku, Oku
- Radio Lolodorf, Lolodorf
- Satellite FM, Yaoundé
- Radio Equatoriale, Sangmélimad
- Radio Casmando, Douala
- Hit Radio, Douala
- Stone FM Radio (Ndop)
- Lakesite Radio (Kumba)
- Calvary Good News (Radio Kumba)
- Ocean City Radio (Radio Kumba)
- Radio Hotcocoa (Bamenda)
- Abakwa FM Radio (Bamenda)
- NDEFCAM Radio (Bamenda)
- CBC Radio (Bamenda)
- Chamba Community Radio (Balikumbat) FM 103.0 MHz
- City FM (Bamenda)
- Skysports Radio (Bamenda)
- DMCR (Nkambe)
- Sky FM (Ndu)
- Savanna Radio (Ndu)
- Radio Evangelium, Archdiocese of Bamenda
- Radio Evangelium Diocese of Kumbo
- Radio Evangelium Diocese of Kumba
- Radio Evangelium Diocese of Mamfe
- Divine Mercy Radio, Diocese of Buea
- Renaissance Community Radio (Ndu)
- Community Radio (Kumbo)
- SANTA COMMUNITY RADIO (95.3 FM)
- CAM ONE RADIO (LIMBE)

==== International ====
- BBC World Service: English, with some broadcasts in French
- RFI : French, with some broadcasts in English and Spanish

It is also possible to receive Canal+ Horizons.

== Telecommunications ==
Cameroon's telecommunications network is still inadequate by international standards; the fixed line infrastructure, owned by the monopoly fixed-line service provider Camtel, has outdated equipment and service in the country is irregular. Only 1 out of every 100 Cameroonians has a fixed-line telephone.

As of 2018, 76% of the population (19.1 million people) had mobile phone subscriptions.

== Internet ==
In 2018, Cameroon reportedly had 6.13 million internet users (25% penetration). The majority of these, 5.79 million, access the internet through their mobile phones. Social media penetration was reportedly at 14% in 2018 (3.6 million people). Men and women appear to use the internet equally.

== See also ==
- Freedom of Speech in Cameroon
- Communications in Cameroon
- Internet censorship and surveillance in Cameroon
- Cinema of Cameroon
- Literature of Cameroon

== Bibliography ==
- Francis Beng Nyamnjoh (1990). "How to 'Kill' an underdeveloped press: Lessons from Cameroon". International Communication Gazette. 46: 57–75. doi:10.1177/001654929004600104.
- Ewumbue-Monono Churchill (1992). "Right to Inform and the 1990 Press Law in Cameroon". Africa Media Review. 6 (3). Archived from the original on 21 November 2020 – via Michigan State University Libraries, African e-Journals Project.
- Francis Nyamnjoh; et al. (1996). "Media and Civil Society in Cameroon". Africa Media Review. 10 (3). Archived from the original on 21 November 2020 – via Michigan State University Libraries, African e-Journals Project.
- "Cameroon: Directory: the Press". Africa South of the Sahara 2004. Regional Surveys of the World. Europa Publications. 2004. p. 180+. ISBN 1857431839.
- Francis B. Nyamnjoh (2011), Mass media and democratisation in Cameroon in the early 1990s, Bamenda, Cameroun: Langaa, ISBN 9956717185
- Toyin Falola; Daniel Jean-Jacques, eds. (2015). "Cameroon: Media". Africa: an Encyclopedia of Culture and Society. ABC-CLIO. ISBN 978-1-59884-666-9.
- "Cameroon", Freedom of the Press, USA: Freedom House, 2016, OCLC 57509361
