= Mami Wata (disambiguation) =

The name Mami Wata and its variants may refer to:

- Mami Wata, water deities of the African diaspora
- L'Expression de Mamy-Wata, a satire newspaper printed in Cameroon
- Mami Wata, 2023 film
- Mami Watta, an Ivorian-French drag queen
