= Vodafone (Cameroon) =

- Company type: Private
- Industry: Telecommunications
- Founded: 2016
- Headquarters: Douala, Cameroon
- Key people: Abdallah Nassar (Chief Executive Officer)
- Products: Mobile Networks, Telecom services, etc
- Revenue: 40 Million US dollars (2016)
- Website: vodafone.cm

Vodafone Cameroon was an LTE Internet service provider operating in Cameroon whose services in Cameroon ended on 10 November 2017. It was a subsidiary of Afrimax. The company was formed through a non-equity Partner Market agreement between Vodafone and Afrimax Group. It launched in 2016 in Cameroon's two largest cities, Douala and Yaounde. Plans to extend services to all 10 regions of Cameroon, through a network sharing agreement with Cameroon Telecommunications (CAMTEL), were announced in 2017.

== Market share ==
Vodafone Cameroon was the first LTE service provider in the Cameroon telecommunications market. At the end of 2016, less than four months after launching, Vodafone had roughly 15,000 customers. Vodafone Cameroon then represented more than 80% of the telecom market in Cameroon.

== Withdrawal of service ==
On 14 September 2017, Vodafone Cameroon was required to withdraw Internet services until further notice following a notification from the Telecommunications Regulatory Board. On 10 November 2017 the company made an official statement about their activities being closed in Cameroon.

== See also ==
- Telecommunications in Cameroon
