= Index on Censorship =

Free speech campaign organisation

- Formation: 1972; 54 years ago
- Type: Non-profit
- Headquarters: London, United Kingdom
- Region served: Worldwide
- Board of directors: Trevor Phillips (Chair), Kate Maltby (Deputy Chair), Anthony Barling, Andrew Franklin, James Goode, Helen Mountfield, Ian Rosenblatt, Nick Timothy, Mark Stephens, Ruth Smeeth
- Parent organization: Writers and Scholars International
- Staff: 12
- Website: indexoncensorship.org

Index on Censorship is an organisation campaigning for freedom of expression. It produces a quarterly magazine of the same name from London. It is directed by the non-profit-making Writers and Scholars International, Ltd (WSI) in association with the UK-registered charity Index on Censorship (founded as the Writers and Scholars Educational Trust), which are both chaired by the British television broadcaster, writer and former politician Trevor Phillips. The current CEO is Jemimah Steinfeld.

WSI was created by poet Stephen Spender, Oxford philosopher Stuart Hampshire, the publisher and editor of The Observer David Astor, and the writer and expert on the Soviet Union Edward Crankshaw. The founding editor of Index on Censorship was the critic and translator Michael Scammell (1972–1981), who still serves as a patron of the organisation.

== Founding history ==
=== An Appeal from the USSR ===
The original impetus for the creation of Index on Censorship came from an Open Letter addressed "To World Public Opinion" by two Soviet dissenters, Pavel Litvinov and Larisa Bogoraz. In the words of the samizdat periodical A Chronicle of Current Events, they described "the atmosphere of illegality" surrounding the January 1968 trial of Ginzburg and Galanskov and called for "public condemnation of this disgraceful trial, for the punishment of those responsible, the release of the accused from detention and a retrial which would fully conform with the legal regulations and be held in the presence of international observers." (One of the accused Alexander Ginzburg resumed his dissident activities on release from the camps, until expelled from the USSR in 1979; another, the writer Yuri Galanskov, died in a camp in November 1972.)

The Times (London) published a translation of the Open Letter and in reply the English poet Stephen Spender composed a brief telegram:

“We, a group of friends representing no organisation, support your statement, admire your courage, think of you and will help in any way possible.”

Among the other 15 British and US signatories were the poet W. H. Auden, philosopher A. J. Ayer, musician Yehudi Menuhin, man of letters J. B. Priestley, actor Paul Scofield, sculptor Henry Moore, philosopher Bertrand Russell, writer Mary McCarthy and composer Igor Stravinsky.

Later that year, on 25 August, Bogoraz, Litvinov and five others demonstrated on Red Square against the invasion of Czechoslovakia.

A few weeks before, Litvinov sent Spender a letter (translated and published several years later in the first May 1972 issue of Index). He suggested that a regular publication might be set up in the West "to provide information to world public opinion about the real state of affairs in the USSR".

=== Title, scope and relations with Amnesty International ===
Spender and his colleagues, Stuart Hampshire, David Astor, Edward Crankshaw and founding editor Michael Scammell decided, like Amnesty International, to cast their net wider. They wished to document patterns of censorship in right-wing dictatorships — the military regimes of Latin America and the dictatorships in Greece, Spain and Portugal — as well as the Soviet Union and its satellites.

Meanwhile, in 1971, Amnesty International began to publish English translations of each new issue of A Chronicle of Current Events, which documented human rights abuses in the USSR and included a regular "Samizdat Update". In a 2020 interview, Michael Scammell explained the informal division of labour between the two London-based organisations: "When we received human rights material we forwarded it to Amnesty and when Amnesty received a report of censorship they passed it on to us".

Originally, as suggested by Scammell, the magazine was to be called Index, a reference to the lists or indices of banned works that are central to the history of censorship: the Roman Catholic Church's Index Librorum Prohibitorum (Index of Forbidden Books); the Soviet Union's Censor's Index; and apartheid South Africa's Jacobsens Index of Objectionable Literature.

Scammell later admitted that the words "on censorship" were added as an afterthought when it was realised that the reference would not be clear to many readers. "Panicking, we hastily added the words 'on Censorship' as a subtitle", wrote Scammell in the December 1981 issue of the magazine, "and this it has remained ever since, nagging me with its ungrammaticality (Index of Censorship, surely) and a standing apology for the opacity of its title."

Describing the organisation's objectives at its inception, Stuart Hampshire said:

"the tyrant's concealments of oppression and of absolute cruelty should always be challenged. There should be noise of publicity outside every detention centre and concentration camp and a published record of every tyrannical denial of free expression."

== The magazine ==
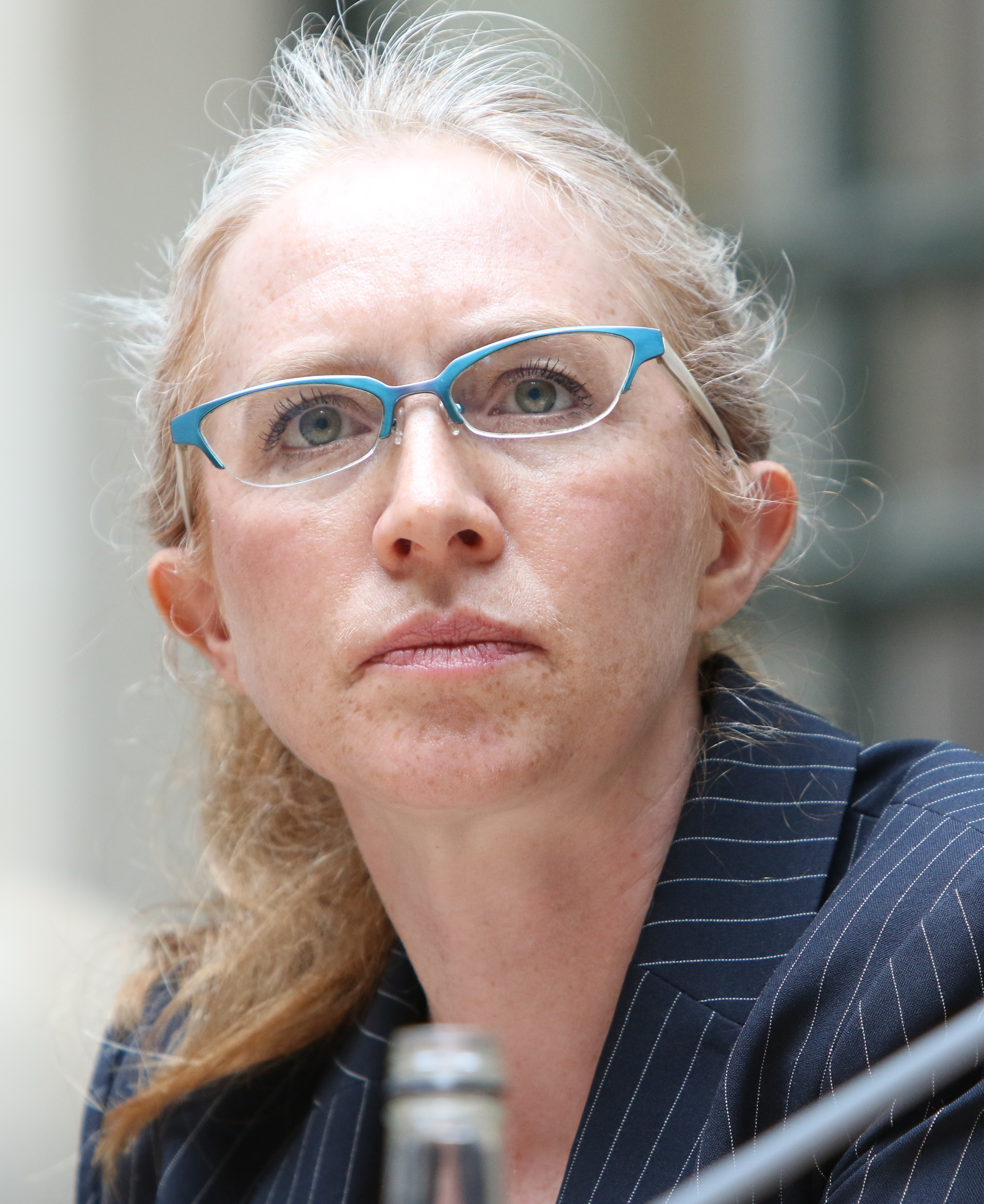
Jodie Ginsberg, former Chief Executive Index on Censorship

Index on Censorship magazine was founded by Michael Scammell in 1972. It supports free expression, publishing distinguished writers from around the world, exposing suppressed stories, initiating debate, and providing an international record of censorship. The quarterly editions of the magazine usually focus on a country or region or a recurring theme in the global free expression debate. Index on Censorship also publishes short works of fiction and poetry by notable new writers. Index Index, a round-up of abuses of freedom of expression worldwide, was published in the magazine until December 2008.

While the original inspiration to create Index came from Soviet dissidents, from its outset the magazine covered censorship in right-wing dictatorships then ruling Greece and Portugal, the military regimes of Latin America, and the Soviet Union and its satellites. The magazine has covered other challenges facing free expression, including religious extremism, the rise of nationalism, and Internet censorship.

In the first issue of May 1972, Stephen Spender wrote:

"Obviously there is the risk of a magazine of this kind becoming a bulletin of frustration. However, the material by writers which is censored in Eastern Europe, Greece, South Africa and other countries is among the most exciting that is being written today. Moreover, the question of censorship has become a matter of impassioned debate; and it is one which does not only concern totalitarian societies."

Accordingly, the magazine has sought to shed light on other challenges facing free expression, including religious extremism, the rise of nationalism, and internet censorship. Issues are usually organised by theme, and contain a country-by-country list of recent cases involving censorship, restrictions on freedom of the press and other free speech violations. Occasionally, Index on Censorship publishes short works of fiction and poetry by notable new writers as well as censored ones.

Over the half century it has been in existence, Index on Censorship has presented works by some of the world's most distinguished writers and thinkers, including Aleksandr Solzhenitsyn, Milan Kundera, Václav Havel, Nadine Gordimer, Salman Rushdie, Doris Lessing, Arthur Miller, Noam Chomsky, and Umberto Eco.

Issues under the editorship of Jemimah Steinfeld featured investigations into how the UK's royal family censor their archives, the plight of Afghan journalists and the rise of Narendra Modi. The editor before, Rachael Jolley, looked at taboos, the legacy of the Magna Carta and Shakespeare's legacy in protest. There have been special issues on China, reporting from the Middle East, and on internet censorship. The Russia issue (January 2008) won an Amnesty International Media Award 2008 for features by Russian journalists Fatima Tlisova and Sergei Bachinin, and veteran Russian free speech campaigner Alexei Simonov, founder of the Glasnost Defence Foundation.

Since January 2010 it has been published by SAGE Publications, an independent for-profit academic publisher. Between 2005 and 2009, the magazine was published and distributed by Routledge, part of the Taylor & Francis group.

In addition to print and annual subscriptions, Index on Censorship is available on Exact Editions, an application for the iPhone/iPad and Android.

It is also a partner with Eurozine, a network of more than 60 European cultural journals.

== Publishing landmarks ==
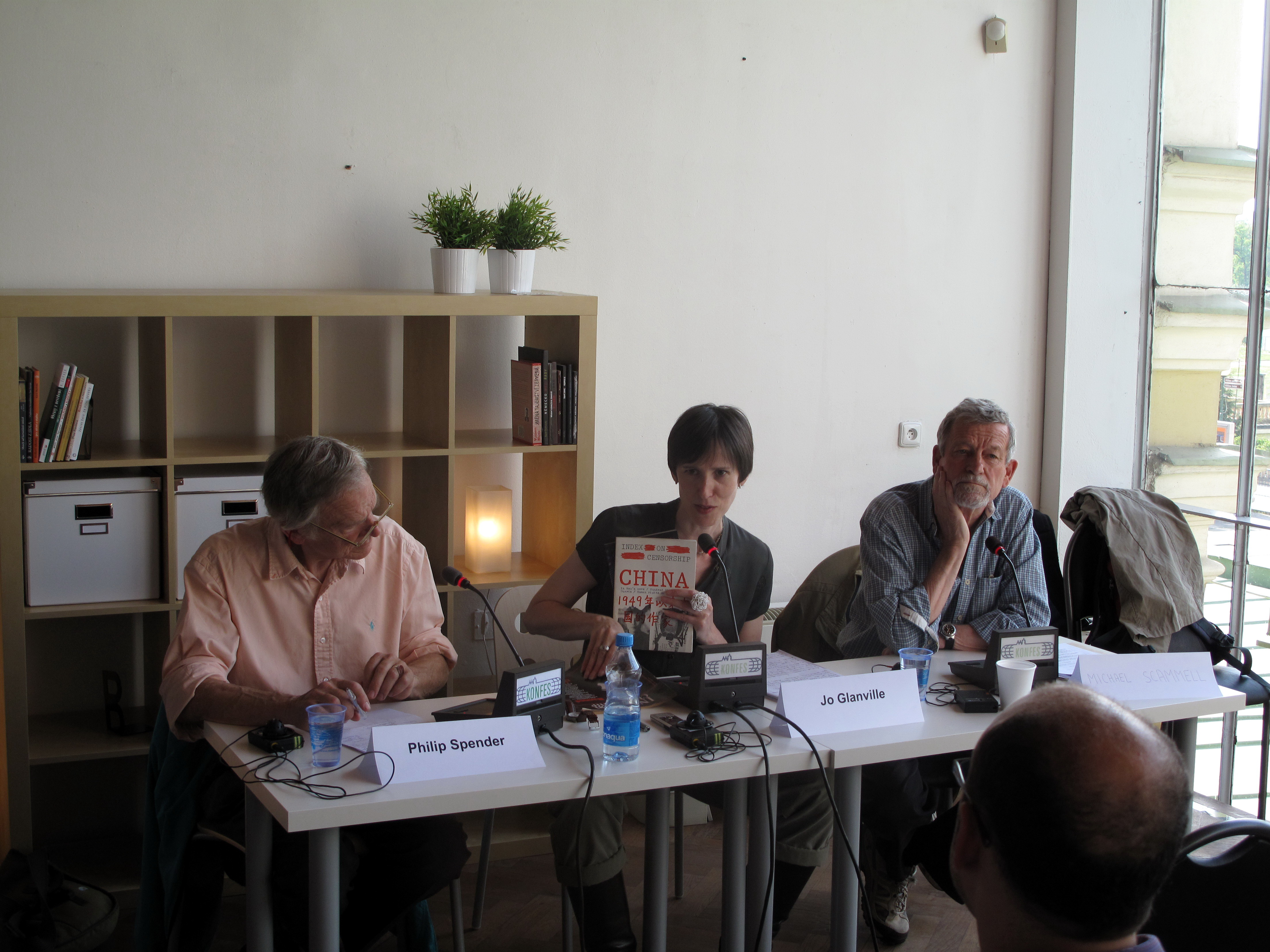
Philip Spender, Jo Glanville, Michael Scammell

Logo until 2012

Other landmark publications include Ken Saro-Wiwa's writings from prison (Issue 3/1997) and a translation of the Czechoslovak Charter 77 manifesto drafted by Václav Havel and others in Issue 3/1977. Index published the first English translation of Alexander Solzhenitsyn's Nobel Prize acceptance speech. Index on Censorship published the stories of the "disappeared" in Argentina and the work of banned poets in Cuba; the work of Chinese poets who escaped the massacres that ended the Tiananmen Square protests of 1989. Index on Censorship has a long history of publishing writers in translation, including Bernard-Henri Lévy, Ivan Klima, Ma Jian and Nobel laureate Shirin Ebadi, and news reports including Anna Politkovskaia's coverage of the war in Chechnya (Issue 2/2002).

Tom Stoppard's play Every Good Boy Deserves Favour (1977) is set in a Soviet mental institution and was inspired by the personal account of former detainee Victor Fainberg and Clayton Yeo's expose of the use of psychiatric abuse in the USSR, published in Index on Censorship (Issue 2, 1975). It was first performed with the London Symphony Orchestra. Stoppard became a member of the advisory board of Index on Censorship in 1978 and remains connected to the publication as a Patron of Index.

Index on Censorship published the World Statement by the International Committee for the Defence of Salman Rushdie in support of "the right of all people to express their ideas and beliefs and to discuss them with their critics on the basis of mutual tolerance, free from censorship, intimidation and violence. Six months later, Index published the Hunger Strike Declaration from four student leaders of the Tiananmen Square protests of 1989, Liu Xiaobo, Zhou Duo, Hou Dejian and Gao Xin.

Index Index, a round-up of abuses of freedom of expression worldwide, continued to be published in each edition of the magazine until December 2008, when this function was transferred to the website. The offences against free expression documented in that first issue's Index Index listing included censorship in Greece and Spain, then dictatorships, and Brazil, which had just banned the film Zabriskie Point on the grounds that it "insulted a friendly power" – the United States, where it had been made and freely shown.

Index on Censorship paid special attention to the situation in then Czechoslovakia between the Soviet invasion of 1968 and the Velvet Revolution of 1989, devoting an entire issue to the country eight years after the Prague Spring (Issue 3/1976). It included several pieces by Václav Havel, including a first translation of his one act play Conversation, and a letter to Czech officials on police censorship of his December 1975 production of The Beggar's Opera by John Gay.

The magazine also carried articles on the state of the Czech theatre and a list of the so-called Padlock Publications, 50 banned books that circulated only in typescript. Index also published an English version of Havel's play Mistake, dedicated to Samuel Beckett in gratitude for Beckett's own dedication of his play Catastrophe to Havel. Both short plays were performed at the Free Word Centre to mark the launch of Index's special issue looking back at the changes of 1989 (Issue 4, 2009).

== Campaigns ==
Index has been the driving force in the UK in the campaign to "StopSLAPPs", strategic lawsuits against public participation. As a result of their campaigning, in 2024 a private members bill was tabled.

Free Speech is not For Sale, a joint campaign report by Index on Censorship and English PEN highlighted the problem of so-called libel tourism and the English law of defamation's chilling effect on free speech. After much debate surrounding the report's ten key recommendations, the UK Justice Secretary Jack Straw pledged to make English defamation laws fairer.

"A free press can't operate or be effective unless it can offer readers comment as well as news. What concerns me is that the current arrangements are being used by big corporations to restrict fair comment, not always by journalists but also by academics." He added: "The very high levels of remuneration for defamation lawyers in Britain seem to be incentivising libel tourism."

These campaigns and others were illustrative of then CEO John Kampfner's strategy, supported by then chair Jonathan Dimbleby, to boost Index's public advocacy profile in the UK and abroad beginning in 2008. Until then the organisation did not regard itself as "a campaigning organisation in the mould of Article 19 or Amnesty International", as former news editor Sarah Smith noted in 2001, preferring to use its "understanding of what is newsworthy and politically significant to maintain pressure on oppressive regimes through extensive coverage".

== Arts and international programmes ==
Index on Censorship also runs a programme of UK based and international projects that put the organisation's philosophy into practice. In 2009 and 2010 Index on Censorship worked in Afghanistan, Burma, Iraq, Tunisia and many other countries, in support of journalists, broadcasters, artists and writers who work against a backdrop of intimidation, repression, and censorship.

The organisation's arts' programmes investigate the impact of current and recent social and political change on arts practitioners, assessing the degree and depth of self-censorship. It uses the arts to engage young people directly into the freedom of expression debate. It works with marginalised communities in UK, creating new platforms, on line and actual for creative expression.

Index on Censorship works internationally to commission new work, not only articles for print and online, but also new photography, film & video, visual arts and performance. Examples have included an exhibition of photostories produced by women in Iraq, Open Shutters, and a programme involving artists from refugee and migrant communities in UK, linking with artists from their country of origin, Imagine art after, exhibited at Tate Britain in 2007.

Index has also worked with Burmese exiled artists and publishers on creating a programme in support of the collective efforts of Burma's creative community. Index also commissioned a new play by Actors for Human Rights, Seven Years With Hard Labour, weaving together four accounts from former Burmese political prisoners now living in the UK. Index also co-published a book of poetry by homeless people in London and St. Petersburg.

== CEO ==
The current Chief Executive of Index on Censorship is Jemimah Steinfeld. She took on this role in May 2024, replacing Ruth Anderson, who left the organisation to follow a political path. The Chief Executive of Index on Censorship from 2014 through to 2020 was Jodie Ginsberg, who is now the CEO of the CPJ.

== Freedom of Expression Awards ==
Freedom of Expression Awards
- "Celebrating the courage and creativity of some of the world's greatest journalists, artists, campaigners and digital activists"
- Awarded for: courage, creativity and resilience in tackling censorship
- Sponsored by: Private Internet Access, Google, SAGE Publications, Daily Mail and General Trust, Daily Mirror, Edwardian Hotels, The Daily Telegraph, Psiphon, News UK, France Médias Monde, Vodafone, Mainframe.
- Location: London, United Kingdom
- Country: United Kingdom
- Presented by: Index on Censorship
- First award: 2001
- Final award: 2022
- Website: https://www.indexoncensorship.org/awards

Index on Censorship annually presents awards to journalists, artists, campaigners and digital activists from around the world who make a significant contribution to free expression over the previous year. Sponsors have included The Guardian, Google, SAGE Publications and the London law firm Doughty Street Chambers.

The 2020 awards were held online in April 2020 during the 2019–20 COVID-19 pandemic. In 2022, the awards were presented on 27 October in London.

2022 winners: Journalism: Huang Xueqin; Campaigning: OVD-Info; Arts: Hamlet Lavastida; Trustee Award: Andrey Kurkov.

2021 winners: Journalism: Samira Sabou; Campaigning: Abdelrahman 'Moka' Tarek; Arts: Tatyana Zelenskaya; Trustee Award: Arif Ahmed.

2020 winners: Journalism: OKO.press; Campaigning: Sayed Ahmed Alwadaei, Veysel Ok; Digital: 7amleh; Arts: Yulia Tsvetkova.

2019 winners: Journalism: Mimi Mefo; Campaigning: Cartoonists Rights Network, International; Digital: Fundación Karisma; Arts: Zehra Doğan.

2018 winners: Journalism: Wendy Funes; Campaigning: Egyptian Commission for Rights and Freedoms; Digital: Habari RDC; Arts: The Museum of Dissidence.

2017 winners: Journalism: Maldives Independent; Campaigning: Ildar Dadin; Digital: Turkey Blocks; Arts: Rebel Pepper.

2016 winners: Journalism: Zaina Erhaim; Campaigning: Bolo Bhi; Digital: GreatFire; Arts: Murad Subay.

2015 winners: Journalism: Rafael Marques de Morais and Safa Al Ahmad; Campaigning: Amran Abdundi; Digital:Tamas Bodoky; Arts: Mouad "El Haqued" Belghouat.

2014 winners: Journalism: Azadliq; Advocacy: Shahzad Ahmad; Digital: Shu Choudhary; Arts: Mayam Mahmoud.

2013 winners: Journalism: Kostas Vaxevanis; Digital Freedom: Bassel Khartabil; Advocacy: Malala Yousafzai; Arts: Zanele Muholi.

2012 winners: Journalism: Idrak Abbasov; Advocacy: Bahrain Centre for Human Rights, collected by Nabeel Rajab; Innovation: Freedom Fone by Kubatana; Arts: Ali Ferzat; 40th Anniversary Award: Research and Information Centre "Memorial (society)" St Petersburg.

2011 winners: Journalism: Ibrahim Eissa; Advocacy: Gao Zhisheng; New Media: Nawaat; Arts: M. F. Husain; Special Commendation: Belarus' Prisoners of Conscience, collected by the Belarus Free Theatre.

2010 winners: Journalism: Radio La Voz; Advocacy: Rashid Hajili; Publishing Award: Andalus Press; New Media Award: Twitter; Freemuse Award: Mahsa Vahdat; Special Commendation: Heather Brooke.

2009 winners: Journalism: The Sunday Leader – Sri Lanka; Film: Ricki Stern and Anne Sundberg, The Devil Came on Horseback; New Media: Psiphon; Books: Ma Jian, Beijing Coma; Law: Malik Imtiaz Sarwar.

2008 winners: Journalism: Arat Dink and Agos magazine; Mohamed Al-Daradji and Ahlaam; New Media: Julian Assange and WikiLeaks; Books: Francisco Goldman, The Art of Political Murder; Law: U Gambira and the Monks of Burma.

2007 winners: Journalism: Kareem Amer; Film: Yoav Shamir, Defamation; Whistleblower: Chen Guangcheng; Books: Samir Kassir; Law: Siphiwe Hlophe.

2006 winners: Journalism: Sihem Bensedrine; Film: Bahman Ghobadi, Turtles Can Fly; Whistleblower: Huang Jingao; Books: Jean Hatzfeld, Into the Quick Life: The Rwandan Genocide – the Survivors Speak and A Time for Machetes: the Killers Speak; Law: Beatrice Mtetwa.

2005 winners: Journalism: Sumi Khan; Books: Soldiers, Light by Daniel Bergner; Film: Final Solution, Rakesh Sharma; Campaigning: Center of Constitutional Rights; Whistleblowing: Grigoris Lazos.

2004 winners: Journalism: Kaveh Golestan; Music: West–Eastern Divan Orchestra; Whistleblowing: Satyendra Dubey; Film: Amamdla! by Lee Hirsch; Books: Slave by Mende Nazer and Damien Lewis; Special: Mordechai Vanunu; Censor of the Year: John Ashcroft.

2003 winners: Journalism: Fergal Keane; Whistleblowing: Tony Kevin; Censor of the Year: Jonathan Moyo; Circumvention of Censorship: Al Jazeera; Defence of Free Expression: Hashem Aghajari.

2002 winners: Defence of Free Expression: Anna Politkovskaya; Circumvention of Censorship: Şanar Yurdatapan; Whistleblowing: Jiang Weiping; Censor of the Year: Silvio Berlusconi.

2001 winners: Defence of Free Expression: Mashallah Shamsolvaezin; Whistleblowing: Grigory Pasko; Circumvention of Censorship: Lorrie Cranor, Avi Rubin and Marc Waldman; Censor of the Year: UK Ministry of Defence (MoD).

== Controversies ==
=== Theo Van Gogh ===
In November 2004, Index on Censorship attracted further controversy over another indexonline.org blog post by Jayasekera that, to many readers, seemed to condone or justify the murder of Dutch film-maker Theo van Gogh. The blog described Van Gogh was a "free-speech fundamentalist" on a "martyrdom operation[,] roar[ing] his Muslim critics into silence with obscenities" in an "abuse of his right to free speech". Describing Van Gogh's film Submission as "furiously provocative", Jayasekera concluded by describing his death:

"A sensational climax to a lifetime's public performance, stabbed and shot by a bearded fundamentalist, a message from the killer pinned by a dagger to his chest, Theo Van Gogh became a martyr to free expression. His passing was marked by a magnificent barrage of noise as Amsterdam hit the streets to celebrate him in the way the man himself would have truly appreciated. And what timing! Just as his long-awaited biographical film of Pim Fortuyn's life is ready to screen. Bravo, Theo! Bravo!"

There were many protests from both left-wing and right-wing commentators. In December 2004, Nick Cohen of The Observer wrote:

"When I asked Jayasekera if he had any regrets, he said he had none. He told me that, like many other readers, I shouldn't have made the mistake of believing that Index on Censorship was against censorship, even murderous censorship, on principle – in the same way as Amnesty International is opposed to torture, including murderous torture, on principle. It may have been so in its radical youth, but was now as concerned with fighting 'hate speech' as protecting free speech."

Ursula Owen, the chief executive of Index on Censorship, while agreeing that the blog post's "tone was not right" contradicted Cohen's account of his conversation with Jayasekera in a letter to The Observer.

=== Danish cartoons ===
In December 2009, the magazine published an interview with Jytte Klausen about a refusal of Yale University Press to include the Mohammed Cartoons in Klausen's book The Cartoons that Shook the World. The magazine declined to include the cartoons alongside the interview.
