= Mayam Mahmoud =

Egyptian activist

- Born: Egypt
- Genre: hip hop
- Occupations: rapper, activist

Mayam Mahmoud is an Egyptian rapper and women's rights activist. She grew in popularity at the age of 18 while performing on the TV talent show Arabs Got Talent in October 2013. Mahmoud's work on the show led her to the semi-finals, where she was then voted off. Nevertheless, Mahmoud continued to rap and perform for audiences. As Egypt's first veiled rapper, Mahmoud's lyrics express the fight for women's rights and condemn the enduring problem of sexual harassment in Egypt. In London, on March 20, 2018, Mahmoud won the Index Arts Award for her work.

== Biography ==
=== Life and career ===
Mahmoud first began rapping at the age of ten, after her mother had introduced her to poetry. Her family was uncertain whether rapping was suitable for Mahmoud as she was a female, and the rap industry was dominated by males. As she continued to rap amongst her family they began to show more interest and respect for her gift. Soon after, her family allowed her to record a mastered track in Alexandria, Egypt.

Mahmoud made it onto Arabs Got Talent when she was 18 and quickly made a name for herself as Egypt's first veiled rapper. Mahmoud believes hip hop music is about the language being used, giving people the ability to express their thoughts and emotions. After performing in front of millions on television, Mahmoud continued rapping for audiences, which were mainly students.

Mahmoud studied economics as an undergraduate.

In 2013 Mahmoud created a Facebook event called "Carnival of Freedom" allowing users to show or post day-to-day activities that fall outside of Egypt's culture and norms. The goal was to help women express themselves freely without being stigmatized.

In March 2014 her efforts were recognized during the Index Freedom of Expression Awards when she received the Index Art Award. At the ceremony she performed one of her songs while wearing a dress that displayed in both graphics, and writing, support for women.

She has continued to rap and fight for women's equality, despite some of the troubles she has faced. Mahmoud stated, "The girls in this field are thought to have bad morals. It's known that when a girl tries to record a track, she will just be one girl in the studio with a lot of guys for a long time. So it's hard to find someone to work with her, to create a beat, to master the track." Religion does not hold Mahmoud back personally. Wearing the hijab is her personal choice. She said, "if I’m going to add anything new to my life it has to go with my initial choices".

=== Impact ===
Mahmoud's popularity came about in a very political time in Egypt. The Arab Spring specifically had changed the atmosphere immensely. It created a strong movement among the youth and Mahmoud is prime example of it doing so.

When music in Egypt deviates from societies norm it has been known to receive immense criticism. Mahmoud has faced both positive and negative remarks for her work. Some were angry, and believed she was misrepresenting Islam, while others felt a strong connection to her lyrics and supported her with messages on Facebook.

As a female rapper Mahmoud hopes her success will influence women, particularly in Egypt, and urge them to challenge the patriarchal customs and prejudices that exist. "According to a UN survey released in April, 99.3 per cent of Egyptian women reported being sexually harassed, causing 91 per cent to be fearful in the street." Mahmoud said, "every time we don't say anything, we make the problem bigger. Maybe the reason harassment is worse here than many other places is because we choose to shut up – and then they think they can do it more and more."

== Bibliography ==
- Emanuela De Blasio, "Female rap in Arab countries. The case of Mayam Mahmoud, Miscelánea De Estudios Árabes Y Hebraicos, volume 71, 2022, pages 85-108.
