= Samira Sabou =

Nigerien journalist

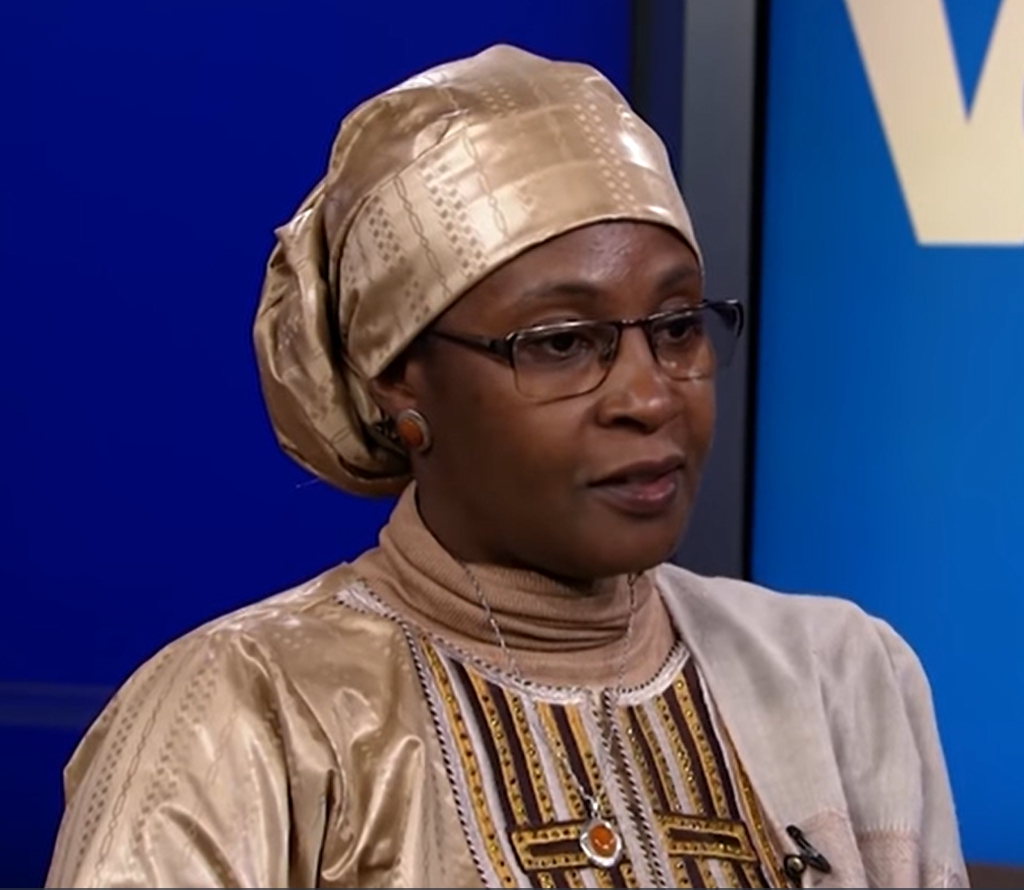
- Born: 1981 (age 44–45); Niamey, Niger
- Education: Institut de Formation aux Techniques de l'Information et de la Communication
- Occupations: Journalist; Blogger
- Employer: ONEP (before 2017)
- Known for: Anti-corruption activism
- Spouse: Abdoulaker Nouhou
- Awards: Index on Censorship Freedom of Expression Award (2021)

Samira Sabou (born 1981) is a Nigerien journalist and blogger. The founder of the economic and social development website Mides-Niger and the president of the Association of Bloggers for Active Citizenship, in addition to running her own popular Facebook page, Sabou has been arrested and prosecuted by consecutive Nigerien governments for her reporting, which frequently covers state corruption.

== Personal life ==
Sabou was born in Niamey, the Nigerien capital, in 1981, but spent part of her childhood in Montreal, Canada, where she was educated. She returned to Niger in the early 2010s, where she studied at the Institut de Formation aux Techniques de l'Information et de la Communication (IFTIC) in Niamey, graduating first in her class.

She is married to Abdoulaker Nouhou.

== Journalism career ==
=== Le Sahel and Le Sahel Dimanche ===
Following her graduation, Sabou began working as a journalist for the Office National d'Édition et de Press (ONEP), a state-run press agency that owned two of the largest newspapers in Niger, Le Sahel and Le Sahel Dimanche. She was fired from ONEP in 2017, four days after posting a photo on social media in which she mimicked a pose by the then-President of Niger Mahamadou Issoufou for the Australian newspaper The Australian, in which he stood leaning on two chairs with his legs crossed. ONEP publicly disputed Sabou's claim that she had been fired for parodying the president, stating they requested the photo be deleted solely because it was taken in ONEP's offices, and instead claimed her dismissal stemmed from "inappropriate behaviour while she was in the field". Many social media users publicly supported Sabou by sharing photos of them copying Issoufou's pose.

=== Facebook page, Mides-Niger and ABCA ===
Following her dismissal, Sabou turned her personal Facebook page into a newsfeed where she reported on local news, in addition to providing factchecks on government reports and actions. As of October 2023, Sabou's Facebook page has 293, 000 followers.

Sabou also established Mides-Niger (French: Magazine d'Information sur le Développement Economique et Social, lit. 'Economic and Social Development Information Magazine'), in which she provides information and reporting on economic and social development in Niger.

Sabou is the president of the Association of Bloggers for Active Citizenship (l'Association des Blogueurs pour la Citoyenneté Active, ACBA), which advocates for a more prominent public role for women in Nigerien society and culture. This has included providing training to female journalists about disseminating information on social media in light of the 2019 Nigerien cybercrime law, which greatly restricted freedom of expression in the country. Through ACBA, Sabou has also campaigned for freedom of expression and against child marriage.

== Arrests and charges ==
=== 2020 defamation case ===
In June 2020, Sabou reported on alleged corruption within the Ministry of Defence, concerning overbilling and false contracts related to military equipment. A comment by a third party on the article cited a link between the reports and President Issoufou's son and deputy chief of staff, Sani Issoufou Mahamadou. Mahamadou subsequently filed a criminal complaint against Sabou for defamation, stating he had been unfairly implicated in the case.

Sabou, who was pregnant at the time, was arrested and detained for 48 days before being released. During her detainment, Amnesty International campaigned for her release, describing her investigation as "legitimate" and calling the defamation charge a "manoeuvre" to undermine her work, as well as the work of other anti-corruption activists in Niger. Sabou was the first person to be charged under Niger's restrictive cybercrime law, which had been passed the previous year.

At Sabou's trial in July 2023, the state prosecutor requested that Sabou be sentenced to one month and one week in prison. On 28 July, Sabou was found not guilty and the charges against her were dropped.

=== 2022 defamation case ===
In January 2022, Sabou and fellow journalist Moussa Aksar both shared on social media a report by the Global Initiative Against Transnational Organized Crime about drug trafficking in Niger. Shortly afterwards, both were arrested, and charged with "defamation by means of electronic communication" following a complaint the government of the new President of Niger, Mohamed Bazoum, resulting in a fine and a one month suspended prison sentence.

Sabou appealed her sentence, and echoed calls by the Committee to Protect Journalists to reform Niger's 2019 cybercrime bill, which the CPJ had stated was being used to target journalists critical of the Nigerien government.

=== 2023 public order case ===
Following the 2023 Nigerien coup d'état in July 2023, in which the Government of Niger was overthrown by the Presidential Guard and replaced with the National Council for the Safeguard of the Homeland, a military junta, Sabou reported that she had received death threats from the new regime's supporters, who considered her to have been hostile to the takeover and unpatriotic. She subsequently filed a criminal complaints over the threats and harassment she had received.

In September 2023, Sabou shared a document reporting on the locations of zone commanders within Niger; subsequently, on 30 September, she was arrested at her mother's home by unidentified men in civilian clothing and detained for eight days. During her detainment, her family and lawyer did not know where Sabou was being held. International human rights organizations Amnesty International and Reporters Without Borders both issued statements expressing concern at Sabou's forced disappearance and called for her immediate release. Her lawyer, Ould Salem Saïd, concurrently filed a criminal complaint that Sabou had been kidnapped and arbitrarily detained by state security forces. The Niamey Judicial Police initially denied having arrested her, but on 7 October she was transferred to the force's criminal investigations unit, where her husband and lawyer were able to visit her.

On 11 October 2023, Sabou was provisionally released after being charged with "supplying intelligence to a foreign power" and "dissemination of data likely to disturb public order". Front Line Defenders condemned the government for charging Sabou, stating that the charges were motivated by her "legitimate and peaceful" work in the field of human rights critical of the ruling junta.

== Recognition ==
In 2021, Sabou received the Freedom of Expression Award from Index on Censorship.

In 2024, International Press Freedom Award from the Committee to Protect Journalists (CPJ).
