= Old German government headquarters in Douala =

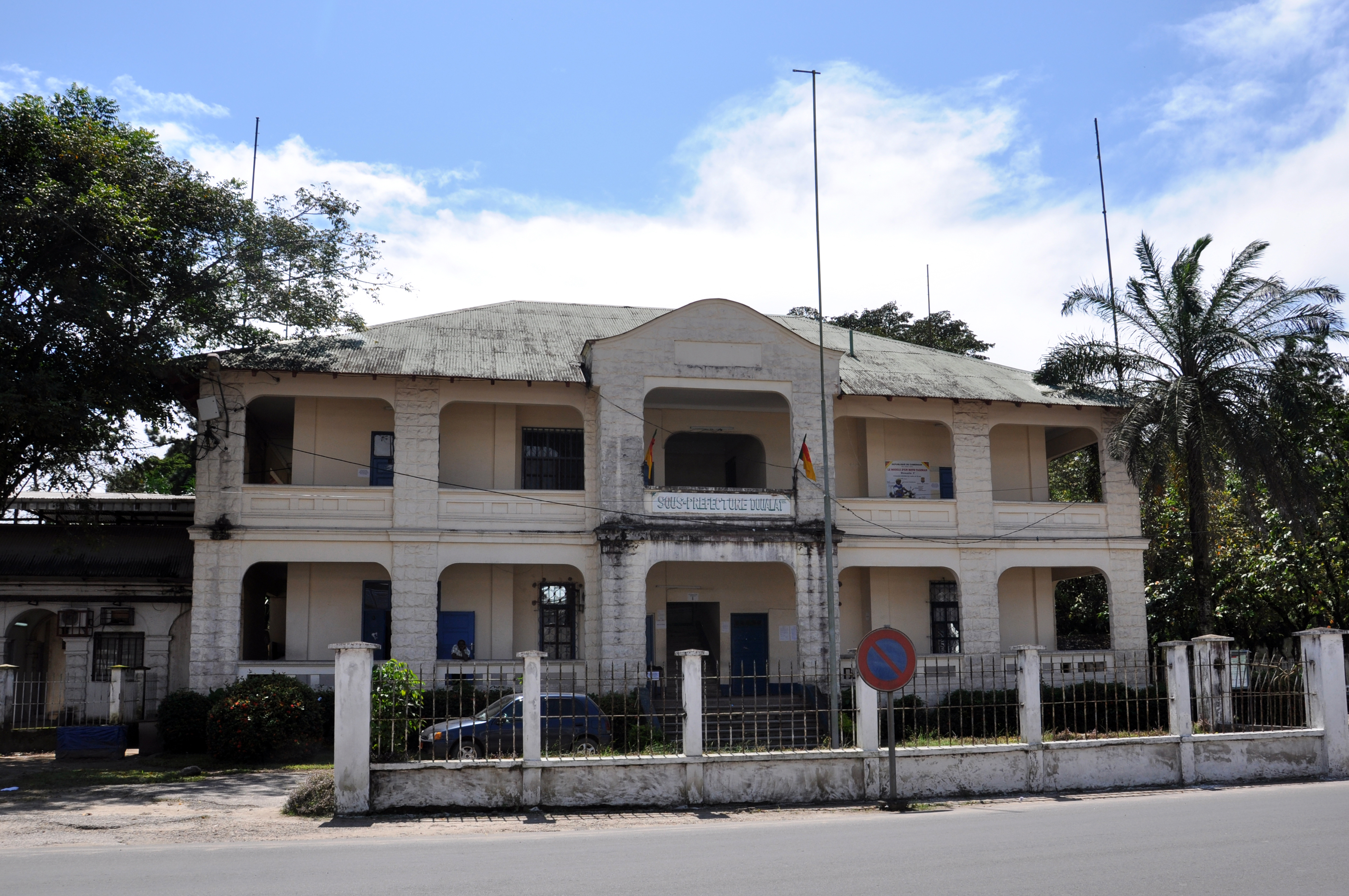
- Interactive map of the Old German government headquarters in Douala area

General information
- Type: official residence
- Architectural style: Prussian architecture
- Location: Douala, Cameroon
- Coordinates: 4.042283°N 9.685379°E
- Current tenants: Douala 1st district sous-préfécture
- Construction started: 1891
- Completed: 1891
- Cost: at least 96,000 Mark
- Client: The German government
- Owner: Cameroonian government

Design and construction
- Architect: Otto Wilhelm Scharenberg

The old German government headquarters situated in Douala is a building constructed in 1891 by the Germans in a classical Prussian style.

== History ==
Between 1891 and 1901, the building hosted the first German administrative headquarters in Cameroon. The headquarters were then transferred to Buea, and then back to Douala in 1908 following the eruption of Mount Cameroon.

The first German Governor, Julius von Soden, in office from 1885 to 1891, divided the country into administrative areas. Von Soden launched military campaigns mostly within the hinterland, subjecting local kingdoms and imposing the German flag and law. His successor, Eugen von Zimmerer institutionalized the police through a decision dated 16 October 1891, as well as the colonial army, i.e. the Schutztruppe. The latter was composed by German officers, black slave soldiers bought or enrolled in Togo, Benin, Nigeria, Gabon and Sierra Leone. The Schutztruppe was assembled to complete the military conquest and maintain the colonial empire, which was challenged by local resistance up to the First World War.

During the French Mandate, the capital was moved to Yaoundé, with the decree of 1 March 1921 and the High Commissioner Delegate occupied the building. The building currently hosts Douala 1st district sous-préfécture.

In 2006 the building is highlighted by an urban sign produced by doual'art and designed by Sandrine Dole; the sign presents an historical image of the building and a description of its history.

== Architecture ==
It was one of the first structures in the heights of the Joss plateau of Douala built in concrete. Originally, it featured a flat roof of concrete-wood, covered with a 30 cm thick layer of sand. This structure did not endure the heavy rains and was replaced in the 1900 by a four-slopes roof.

== See also ==
- Kamerun
