= Villa Mandessi Bell =

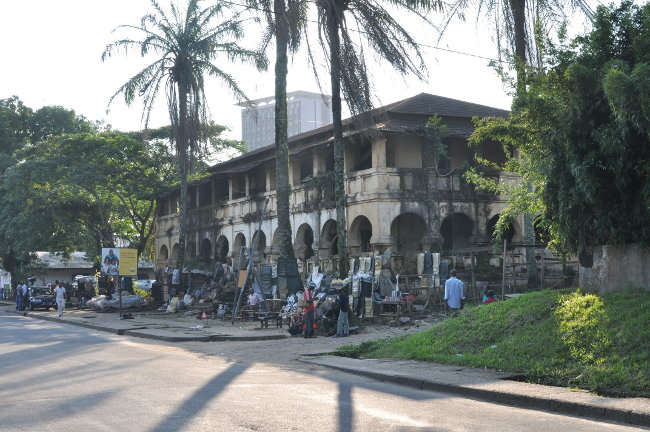
- Interactive map of the Villa Mandessi Bell area

General information
- Type: Villa
- Architectural style: German and colonial architecture
- Location: Douala, Cameroon
- Coordinates: 4.04508°N 9.6887°E
- Construction started: 1904
- Completed: 1910
- Owner: David Mandessi-Bell

The villa Mandessi Bell situated at Douala is a building constructed between 1904 and 1909 by David Mandessi-Bell a rich farmer and commissioner of the king Rudolf Manga Bell. This building is and architecture from the colonial period. It is a representation and legacy of the German occupation in Cameroon.

== History ==
Its master-builder, David Mandessi Bell, was a wealthy planter and King Rudolf's intendant. He lived there until his death in 1936. He was among the first Cameroonians whose revenues were not exclusively related to fishing or doing business. In 1840, when the slave trade was officially prohibited, the Duala turned to other sources of income, as their commercial monopoly was also on the decline. For instance, they initiated plantations in the Nkam, the Abo, or the Mungo. Although of less importance than the huge German farms on the slopes of mount Fako, they nevertheless provided substantial income, enough to build houses such as this one.

This building was constructed in heritage of his son Sam (1911-1978). His son Sam, born in 1911 (died in 1978), continued the farming activity, and lived in this house half of his life. His adoptive brother, Jean Mandessi Bell, along with Léopold Moumé Etia, founded l'Union Camerounaise in Paris, in 1937-38. Consistent with their wish for independence, this organization aimed at obtaining the mandate status for Cameroon. Later, Jean Mandessi Bell became an activist of the Jeucafra (Jeunesse Camerounaise Française) led by Paul Soppo Priso. As the first political association that was acknowledged, if not favored by France, Jeucafra fought against a German come-back in Cameroon, at the eve of the 2nd World War. In their wish to make Cameroon a colony, rather than a territory under mandate, this political group was much criticized, accused of collaborating with the French. Yet it was to become, according to Um Nyobè, the melting pot of the country's first political activists.

In 2006 the building is highlighted by an urban sign produced by doual'art and designed by Sandrine Dole; the sign presents an historical image of the building and a description of its history.

== Architecture ==
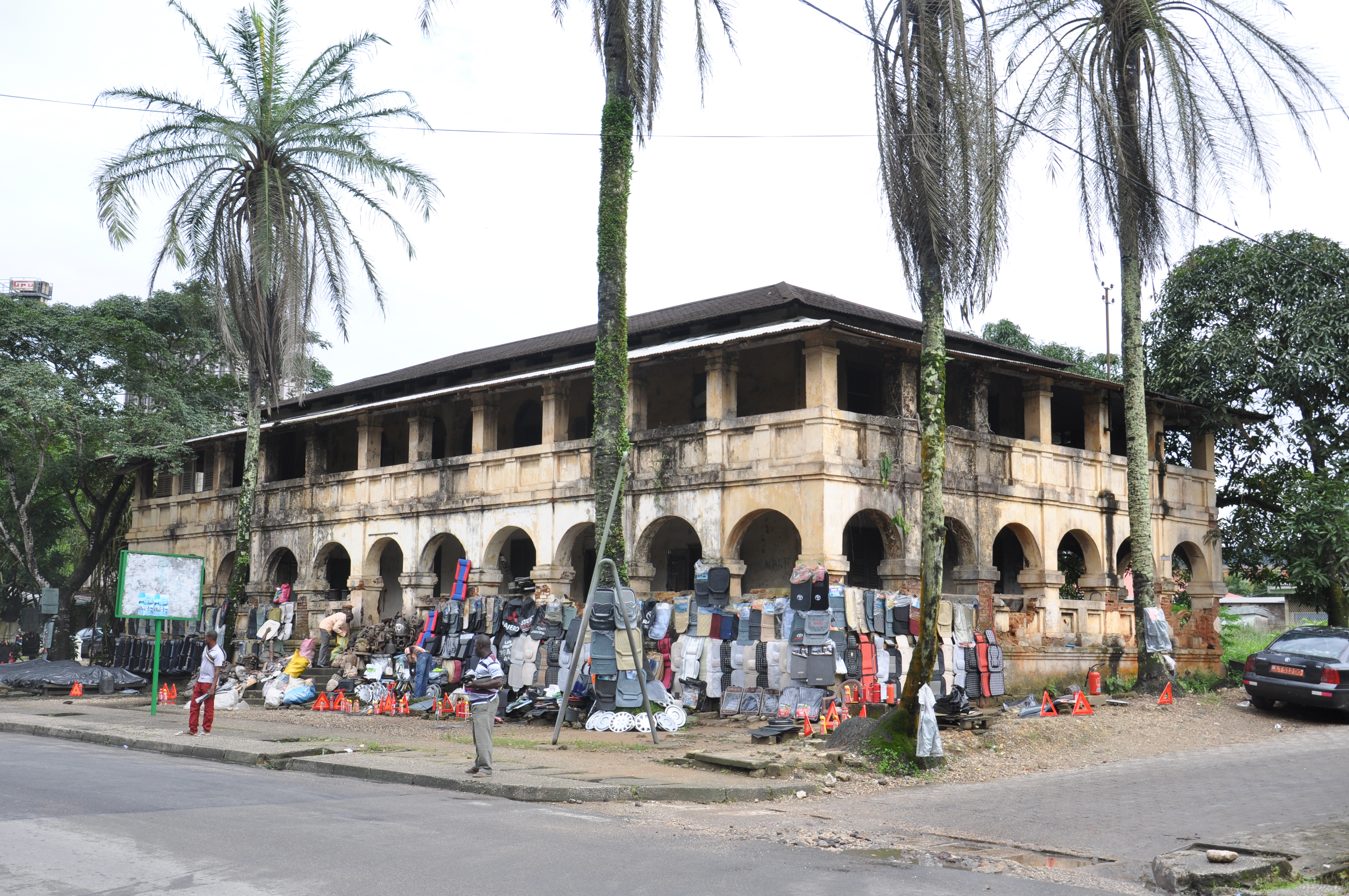
Business activities in front of Villa Mandessi Bell

Built from 1904 to 1909-1910, at the end of the German pacification campaign (soon to be followed by the first town-planning groundwork), this house of patrician size is typical of the German and colonial architecture. The rectangular form, which is constructed with mud bricks facilitates the regulation of the temperature. Its vast roof top protects it from storms which are common in the littoral bounded by the equatorial climate. It is a testimony of the wish of Mandessi Bell, to confirm his success.

== See also ==
- Kamerun
