= Mankon Museum =

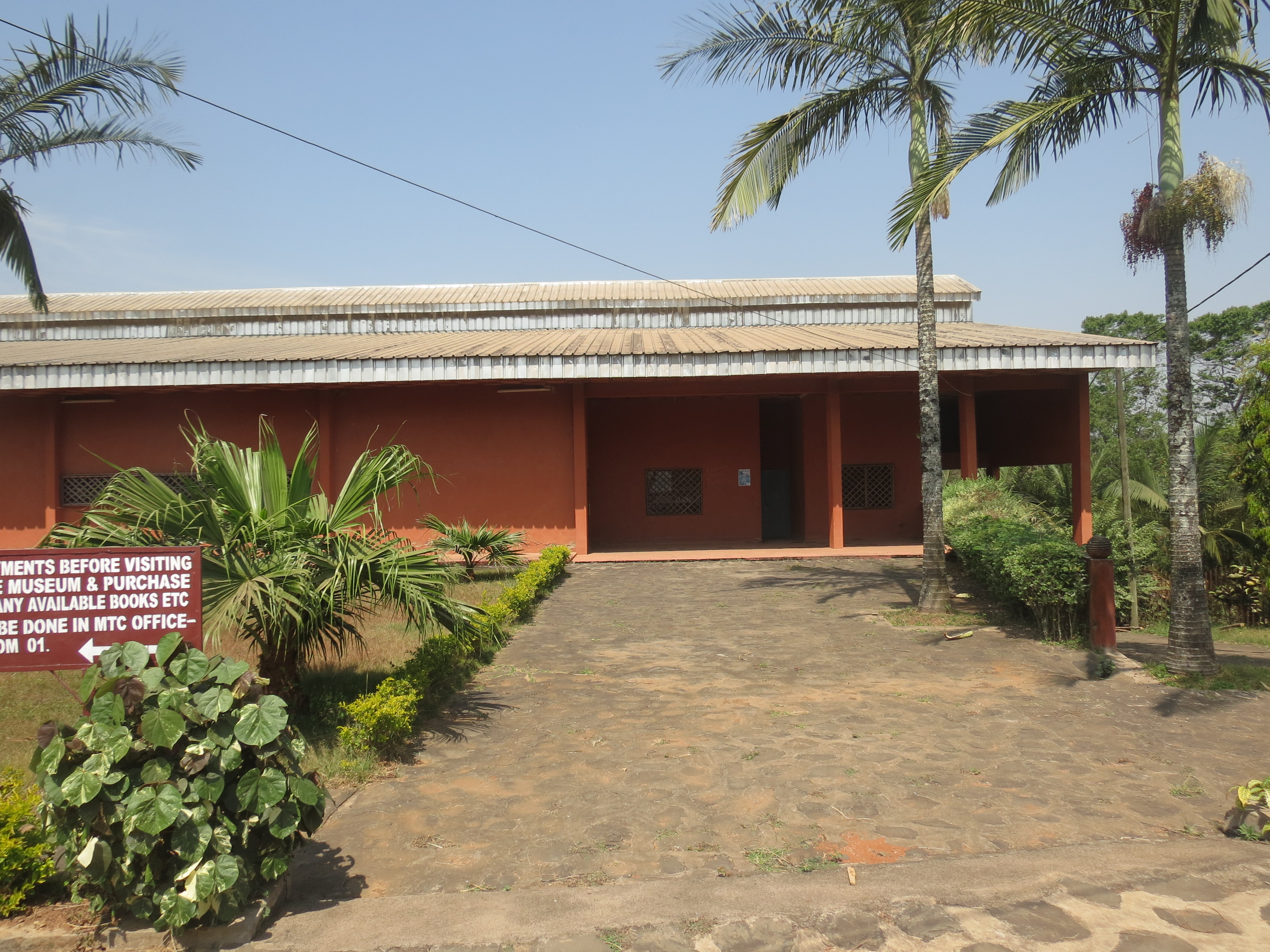
The Mankon Museum Mankon Palace Museum
- Established: 2006
- Location: Mankon-Bamenda, Cameroon
- Website: www.museumcam.org/en/mankon/index.php

The Mankon Museum is an art and cultural museum located in Mankon-Bamenda, Cameroon.

The museum was inaugurated in 2006, and is situated at the entrance to the Mankon Palace.

Many of the historical objects in the collection came directly from the palace. These include some items that traditionally were not supposed to be seen by the general public, a situation that upset some members of the local community.
