= Camtel =

Telecommunication company in Cameroon

CAMTEL
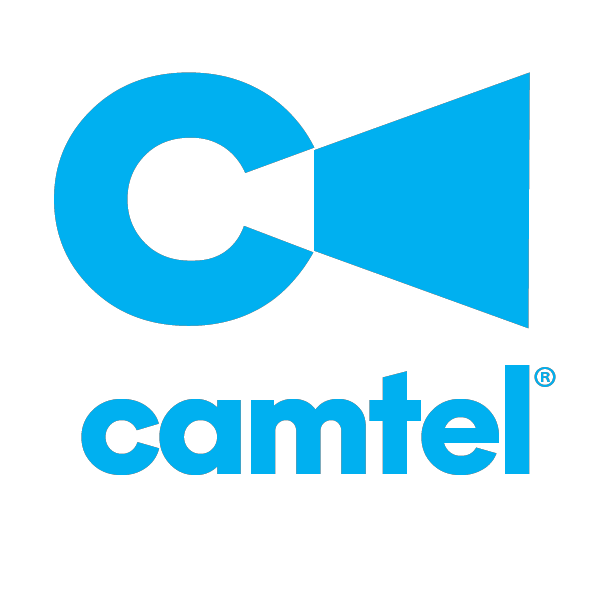
- Type: —
- Industry: Telecommunications
- Headquarters: Yaoundé
- Key people: Judith Yah Achidi, Directeur Général de la Camtel
- Products: Telecommunications services; Internet services; Digital Television
- Revenue: —
- Number of employees: —
- Website: www.camtel.cm

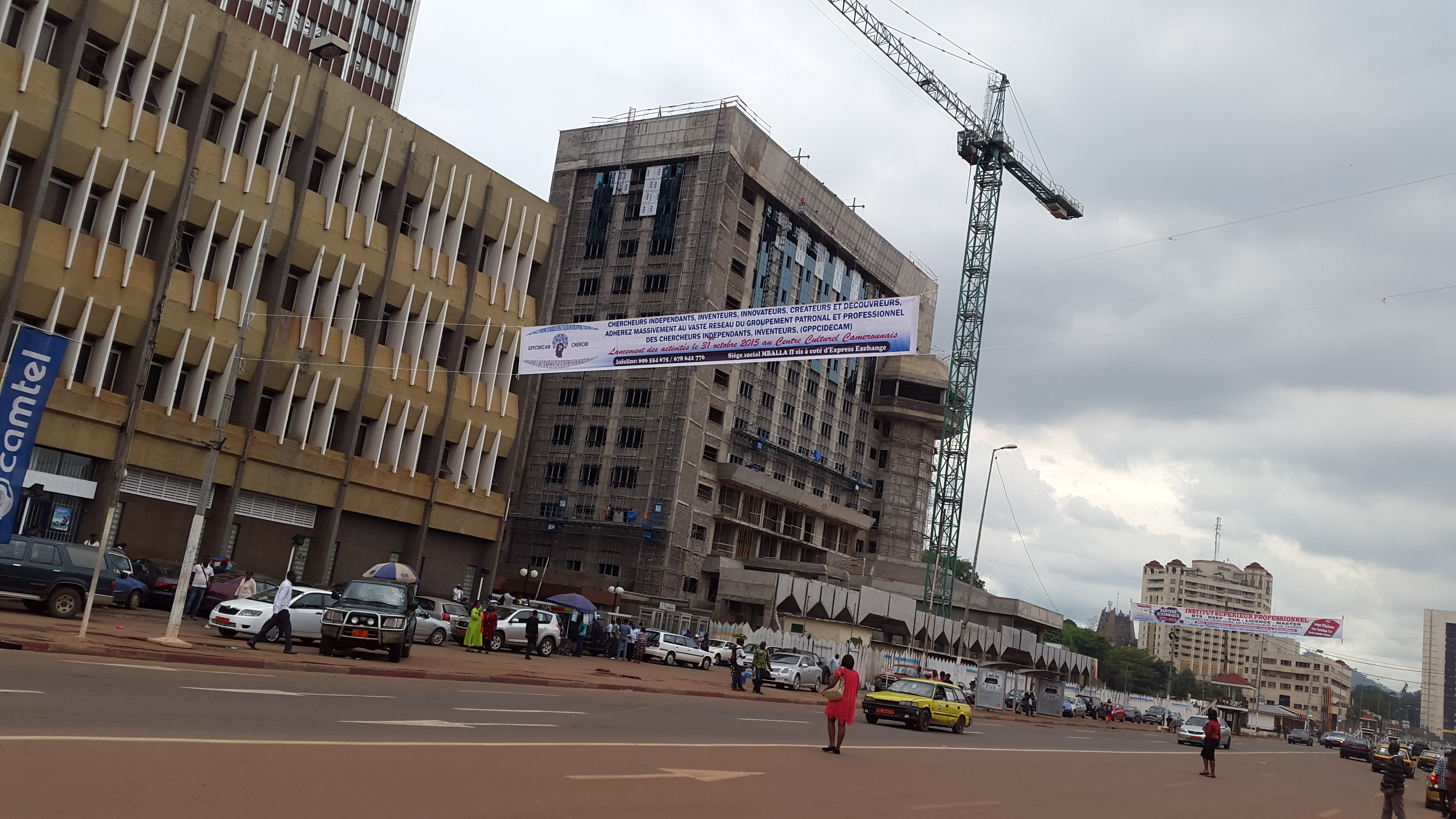
Camtel in Yaoundé.

Camtel is a national telecommunications and Internet service provider in Cameroon. The company is keen to building its network, including: Access to a CDMA (Code Division Multiple Access) network; digitization of the country's telephone exchanges; and optical fiber along the highway between Douala and Yaoundé, and between Kribi and Lolodorf.

There are 47 telephone exchanges in the company's system. There are about 150,000 telephone lines in its cable network and its switching network. Camtel operates three satellite-to-earth stations which are: Bepanda, Zamengoe and Garoua.

== History ==
Before Camtel, telecommunications in Cameroon were managed by several government entities. One of the key institutions was INTELCAM (International Telecommunications of Cameroon), responsible for managing international communications. In 1998, by Presidential Decree No. 98/198 of 8 September 1998, the Cameroonian government merged the Directorate of Telecommunications (which was part of the Ministry of Posts and Telecommunications) and INTELCAM to form Camtel (Cameroon Telecommunications).

== See also ==
- Telecommunications in Cameroon
