= Baham Royal Museum =

Museum in Baham, Cameroon

The Baham Royal Museum, also known as the Museum of the Palace of Baham, was opened on 1st October 2003. It is an ethnographic museum located in the Haut-Plateau division in the western region of Baham, Cameroon.

== History ==
Beginning and Projects

The museum was opened on 1st October 2003. It presents the culture of the Baham people and the dynasty of the Baham kings. In 1980, the Italian NGO (Centro Orientamento Educativo) played a part in the artistic development of Cameroon by creating a training institute at Mbalmayo. Later a cultural valorisation project was launched entitled project of cultural patrimonial guardianship for the development of Cameroon, a project centered on the creation of 4 museums (Baboungo, Bandjoun, Mankon and Baham) .

== Mission ==
The museum was created to preserve and valorise the cultural heritage of the region and also play an educational role by organising trainings on the production of traditional objects each year. Furthermore, the museum participates to the programs of equitable tourism which seek to promote a tourism respecting the environment and local culture all that supporting the projects of local development.

== Acquisitions, Implementation and Launching ==
The COE (Centro Orientamente Educativo) and many local artists participated to the construction and decoration of the museum which reflects their skills and passions for the Baham culture. The architect Bianca Triaca created the architecture of the museum integrating traditional and modern elements of the local culture. The Baham Royal museum is known for displaying items that are on loan from the local community and still in active cultural use.

== Funding ==
The local artists created the objects which constitute a great part of the collections.

The affiliation of the museum to the program "route des chefferies" gives technical and financial support.

Tourists visiting and political inclusion is also a source of income of the museum.

== Tourism and Exploration ==
The museum is a site of cultural and educational exchange which promotes intercultural dialogue. The museum is part of the program "Equitable Tourism" which seeks to support local development, on the selling price of one travelling ticket by person, equitable tourists reverses 50000FCFA(76 Euro) to support the program of local development. The museum has a great impact in the region by increased tourism to learn about the area and its increased study by local and outside researchers.

The access to the museum is done through Banjoun through N4 or though Baham through the N5.

== Architecture and Space Organisation ==
Architecture

The museum was constructed by Jean-Paul Notue and Bianca Triaca. The building is of rectangular form with conical zincs. The principal entrance is decorated with sculptures and paintings characteristic of the Bamileke's arts reflecting the cultural identity of the region.

== Services ==
Equipment and Services

Groups can make advanced reservations.

The museum is opened from Monday to Friday (9am to 5pm) and from Saturday to Sunday (10am to 5pm).

The museum organises training sessions during holidays on the production of traditional objects and also guided visits.

== Collections ==
The museum contains a great variety of royal objects such as status, traditional costume, musical instruments and ritual objects. These objects express the history and tradition of the Baham people.

== Permanent Exhibitions ==
It disposes of a permanent exhibition on the theme " Art, Memory and Power" described by almost 300 objects. These objects include paintings, sculptures, jewellery, status items, bags and costumes that express part of the history of the Baham people.

Visitors can also discover the customs, beliefs and ritual practices of the Baham people through these objects.

== Temporary Exhibitions ==
The museum participated to the temporal exhibition "Sur la route des chefferies du Cameroun" in 2022 at the Quai Branly- Jacques-Chirac by borrowing objects such as Batcham masks.
