= Former general Hospital of Douala =

General Hospital of Douala
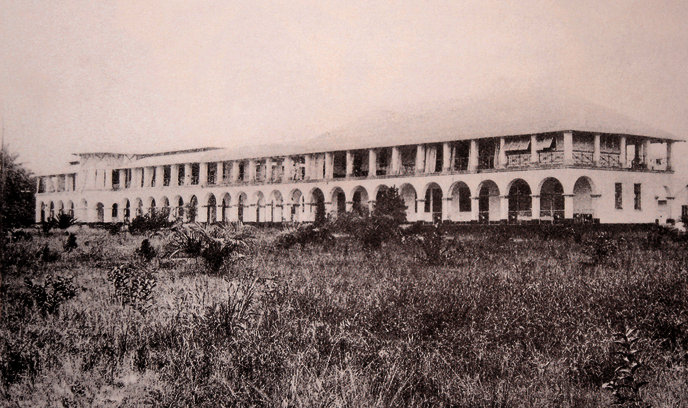
- Interactive map of the General Hospital of Douala area

General information
- Type: hospital
- Location: Douala, Cameroon
- Coordinates: 4.040688°N 9.684468°E
- Current tenants: Police department and the Littoral Delegation of Culture
- Construction started: 1896
- Completed: 1896
- Client: The German government (promoted by Dr Albert Plehn)
- Owner: Government of Cameroon

Design and construction
- Architect: Henri Drees

The former General Hospital situated in Douala is a building constructed in 1896 by the Germans and designed by the architect Henri Drees.

== History ==
Designed by the German architect Henri Drees, this hospital was built in 1896 following Dr Albert Plehn’s initiative. It was created to take care of Europeans patients only, since it was based on the colonialist ideology of that time which was highly segregationist. It was first named "Nachtigal Hospital", on behalf of the roving Consul Nachtigal. Doctor Gustav Nachtigal was in charge of representing Emperor of Germany William I and the Chancellor Bismarck all over the gulf of Guinea. He made legal the 1884 treaties signed with the kings of Douala, instituting German Protectorate on the territory. He supplanted The late consul, nickname given to the British Consul Hewett, still retained in his official duties in Fernando Poo (now Malabo), who got to Cameroon Town too late to negotiate a British establishment in this city. Finally, Nachtigal's remarkable career ended with the official installation of Julius von Soden as the first German Governor, from 1885 to 1891, long before the construction of the hospital.

The French author Louis-Ferdinand Céline, arrived in 1916 in a still German-speaking town, depicted his short stay in this hospital in a memorable extract from his novel Voyage au bout de la nuit.

This building, amazingly gorgeous at that time, was extended twice its size under the French Mandate in 1930. This same year, the French administration built "Hôpital Laquintinie" for the natives, in the same spirit as during the German Freie Zone, a one-kilometer unoccupied zone, conceived to separate Europeans from the natives.

Renamed Hôpital Général when Independence took place, this building includes today the Police department and the Littoral Delegation of Culture.

In 2006 the building is highlighted by an urban sign produced by doual'art and designed by Sandrine Dole; the sign presents an historical image of the building and a description of its history.

== See also ==
- Kamerun
