= Bandjoun Museum =

Bandjoun MuseumThe Bandjoun Museum
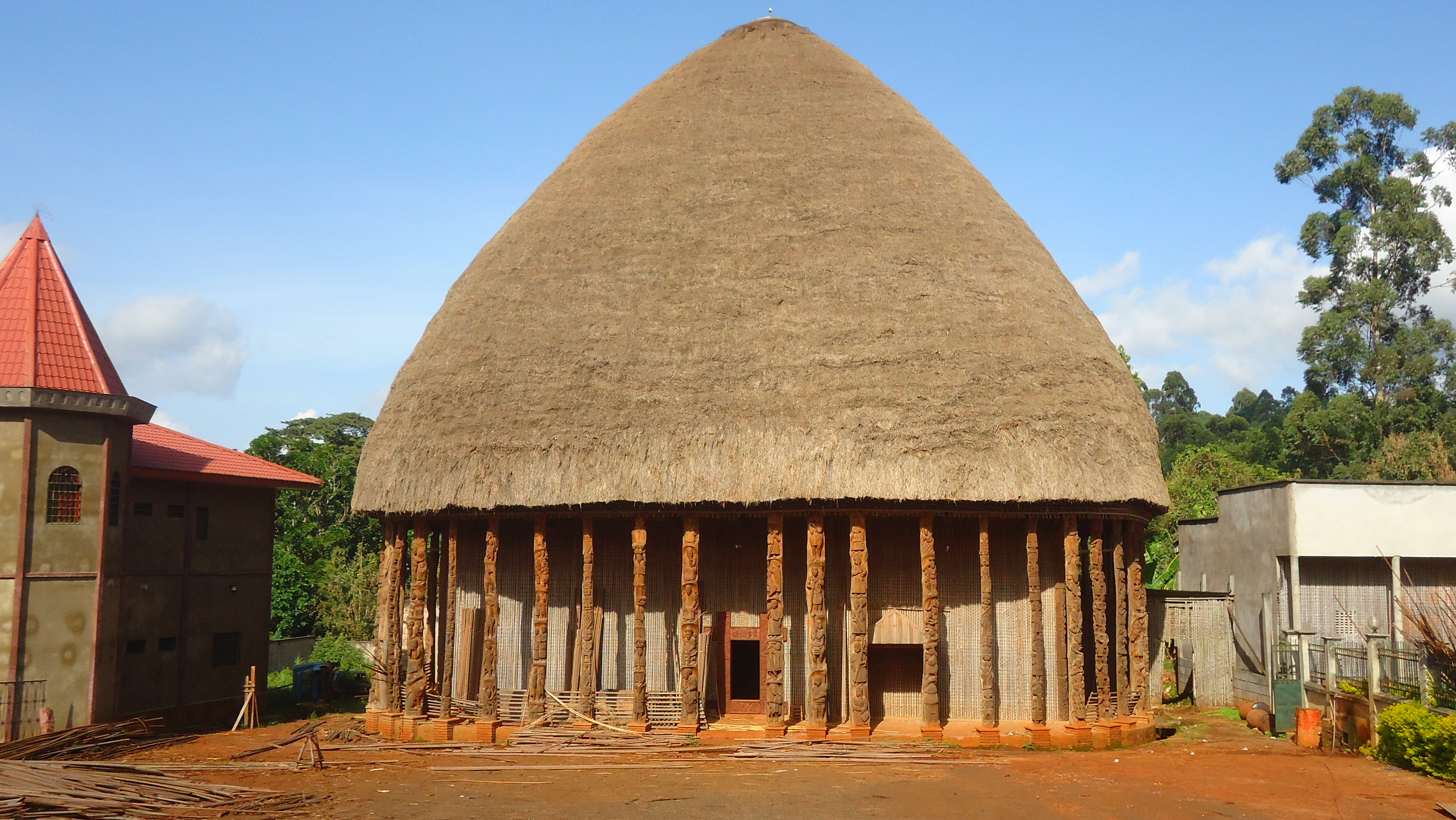
- Facade of Bandjoun Museum

Geography
- Location: Bandjoun, Cameroon

Organisation
- Type: art and cultural museum

The Bandjoun Museum is an art and cultural museum located in Bandjoun, Cameroon.
