= Cahiers d'Études Africaines =

- Discipline: African studies
- Language: English, French

Publication details
- History: 1960-present
- Publisher: Éditions EHESS (France)

Standard abbreviations
- ISO 4: Cah. Études Afr.

Indexing
- ISSN: 0008-0055 (print); 1777-5353 (web)
- LCCN: sn86012778
- JSTOR: 00080055
- OCLC no.: 174145640

Links
- Journal homepage; Online access

The Cahiers d'Études Africaines is a peer-reviewed open access academic journal covering topics in the social sciences as relating to Africa, the West Indies, and the African diaspora. It publishes regular special theme issues on specific regions, problems, or the state of a discipline. The Cahiers d'Études Africaines was established in 1960 and is published by the Editions de l'EHESS, in collaboration with the Centre National de la Recherche Scientifique and the Centre national du livre.
