= Cameroon Radio Television =

National television company

- Industry: Television broadcasting/Radio broadcasting
- Predecessor: Cameroon Television and Cameroon Department of Radio Broadcasting
- Founded: 1987
- Headquarters: Cameroon
- Area served: Cameroon
- Key people: Charles Ndongo, General Manager
- Owner: Government of Cameroon
- Website: www.crtv.cm

Cameroon Radio Television (CRTV) is a major radio and television broadcasting company in Cameroon.

CRTV is a government-controlled radio and television service in Cameroon. It started as Cameroon Television (CTV) and later merged with the radio service to become known as CRTV. It covers all the ten regions of Cameroon, rendering it the indomitable broadcaster amongst a number of private television stations in the country. On 29 June 2016, Charles Ndongo was named new general manager of CRTV by a presidential decree. He replaced Ahmadou Valmouke at a time when the country was on the verge of switching to a digital Television Platform.

CRTV and the African Union of Broadcasting settled a dispute over fees for broadcasting the Africa Cup of Nations in Yaoundé in 2019.

Much of the coverage is done in French, although there is some English programming as well, given that the country is bilingual. CRTV programmes include home-produced documentaries, magazines, news analysis, and imported series from Asia and Brazil.

== History ==
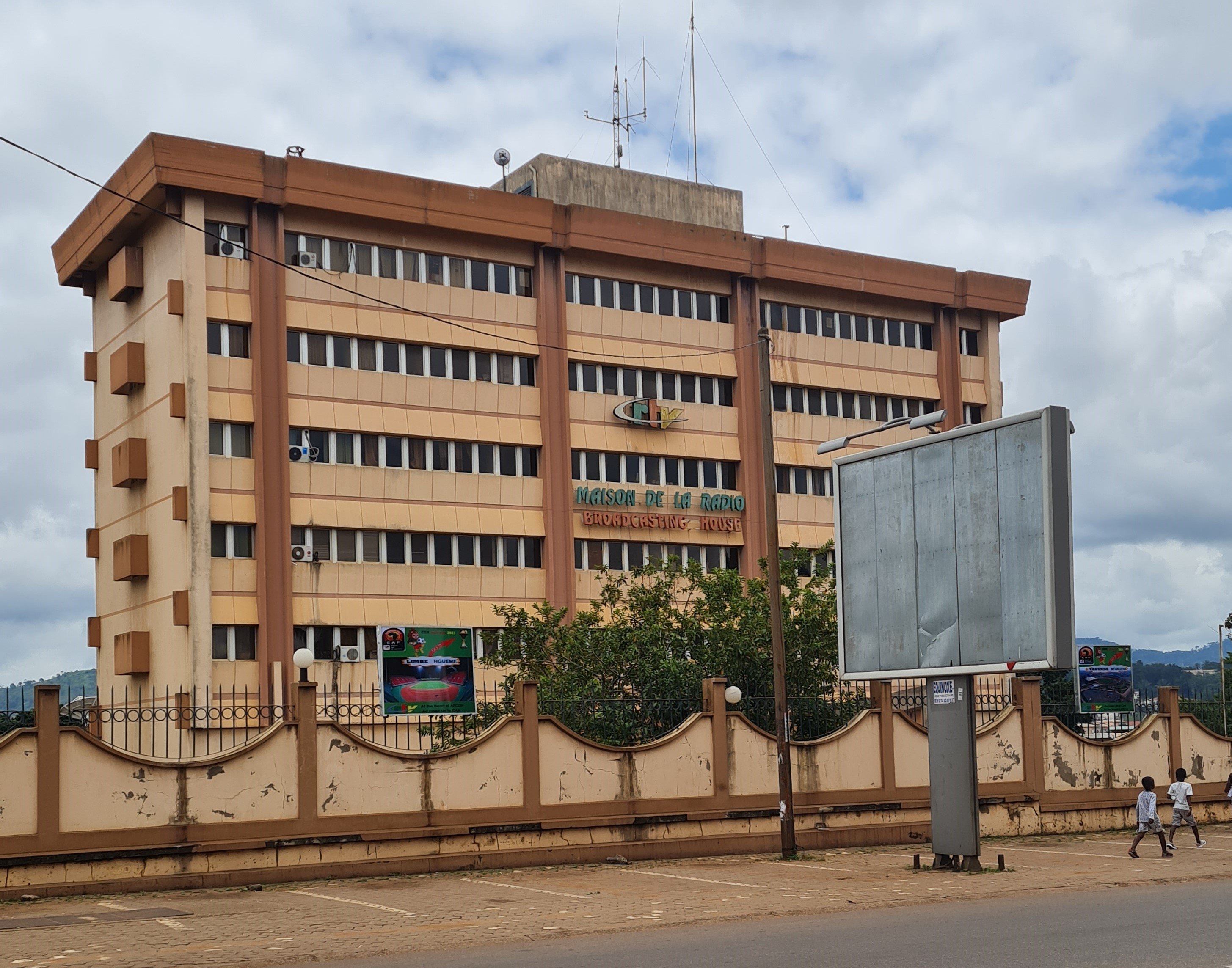
CRTV Radio head office in Yaoundé

Broadcasting began in Cameroon in 1940, after the French government opened the first radio station in Douala, Radio Douala, also known as l'enfant de la Guerre (the Child of War) and having as its first transmitter a radius of 150 watts. This station was a means of propaganda for Free France. Then, a 1KW transmitter was installed in 1950 in order to increase its hearing efficiency. Six years later, this station came under the control of the Société de Radiodiffusion de la France d'Outre-mer (SORAFOM), created to promote the production of programs by local populations. SORAFOM was responsible for installing two radio transmitters of 1KW medium wave and 4KW short wave in Yaoundé and in other regions of the country. In July 1955, Radio Cameroon was officially born.

Other public radio stations were created a few years later, with Radio Yaoundé (1955) and Radio Garoua (1958). Between 1959 and 1961, a mobile radio transmitter operated in Buea, financed by the Nigerian government. On April 14, 1962, SORAFOM became the Office of Radiophonic Cooperation (OCORA) it was this structure that managed Radio Cameroon until 1963, when the Cameroonian government took over broadcasting, with its headquarters in Yaounde.

This structure was introduced into the landscape of the Cameroonian Administration as the Direction of the National Radio Broadcasting of Cameroon (RNC) within the Ministry of Information and Culture. In addition to the three stations existing at the time of Independence; others were created, notably Radio Buéa (1961), Radio Bertoua (1978), Radio Bafoussam (1980), Radio Bamenda (1981), Radio Ngaoundéré, Radio Ebolowa and Radio Maroua (1986).

Television was initiated in 1974 with the signing between the Ministry of Planning and Industry and EUROPACE of a contract to study the establishment of a mass education system through audiovisual. The technical studies of this project which began on November 15, 1974 were finalized on May 15, 1975 with the drafting of specifications and the launch on May 16, 1976 of an international call for tenders. In 1982, two consortiums were retained: THOMSOM - SODETECH for the part equipment and infrastructures of emission and the consortium SIEMENS-TRT-Fougerole for the equipment of production, the network of transmission by Hertzian beams and the buildings. These consortiums began their work on November 25, 1982 for THOMSOM - SODETECH and on January 10, 1983 for the SIEMENS-TRT-Fougerole consortium. Decree number 84/262 of 12 May 1984 created a television project coordination unit, placed under the authority of the Secretary General of the Presidency of the Republic. This cell included:

- a coordinating committee;
- a television unit;
- four technical control units;
- a transmission cell.

The first images were broadcast on March 20, 1985, in Bamenda, during the Congress of the Cameroonian National Union (UNC) which gave birth to the Democratic Rally of the Cameroonian People (RDPC). The first visit of Pope John Paul II to Cameroon was also broadcast during this experimental phase. Television definitely started on Monday, December 23, 1985 at 6 p.m.; broadcasting on channel 5 using a 10 kW transmitter.

On April 26, 1986, by ordinance number 86/001, the National Television Office CTV was created. Decree 86/005 of April 26, 1986 sets the rules for the organization and operation of National Television.

The Direction de la Radiodiffusion and Cameroon Television, which were separate entities, merged in favor of laws number 87/019 of December 17, 1987 establishing the system of audiovisual communication in Cameroon and number 67/020 of December 17, 1987, creating the Cameroonian Broadcasting and Television Office (CRTV). Decree number 88/126 of January 25, 1988 formalized the organization and functioning of the Office of Radiodiffusion-Télévision Camerounaise.

CRTV was directed, in turn, by:

- Florent Etoga Eily from January 29, 1988 to October 26, 1988;
- Gervais Mendo Ze from October 26, 1988 to January 26, 2005;
- Amadou Vamoulké from January 26, 2005 to June 29, 2016;
- Charles Ndongo, managing director since June 29, 2016. Emmanuel Wongibe is deputy managing director.

== Operations ==
=== Radio ===
CRTV is made up of a national radio channel and ten regional stations:

- CRTV Adamaoua
- CRTV Centre
- CRTV Est
- CRTV Extrême-North
- CRTV Littoral
- CRTV North
- CRTV Nord-Ouest
- CRTV Ouest
- CRTV Sud
- CRTV Sud-Ouest

As well as seven local stations:

- CRTV Wave FM
- CRTV Kousseri FM
- CRTV Yagoua FM
- CRTV Yaounde FM94
- CRTV Mount Cameroon FM
- CRTV Suelaba FM
- CRTV Poala FM

=== Television ===
The main channel was joined by two theme channels: CRTV News created on January 28, 2018 and CRTV Sports & Entertainment, launched on June 6, 2019.

== See also ==
- Denise Epoté, head of Africa TV5MONDE
- Media of Cameroon
- Category:Television stations in Cameroon
