= Mimi Mefo =

Cameroonian journalist and activist

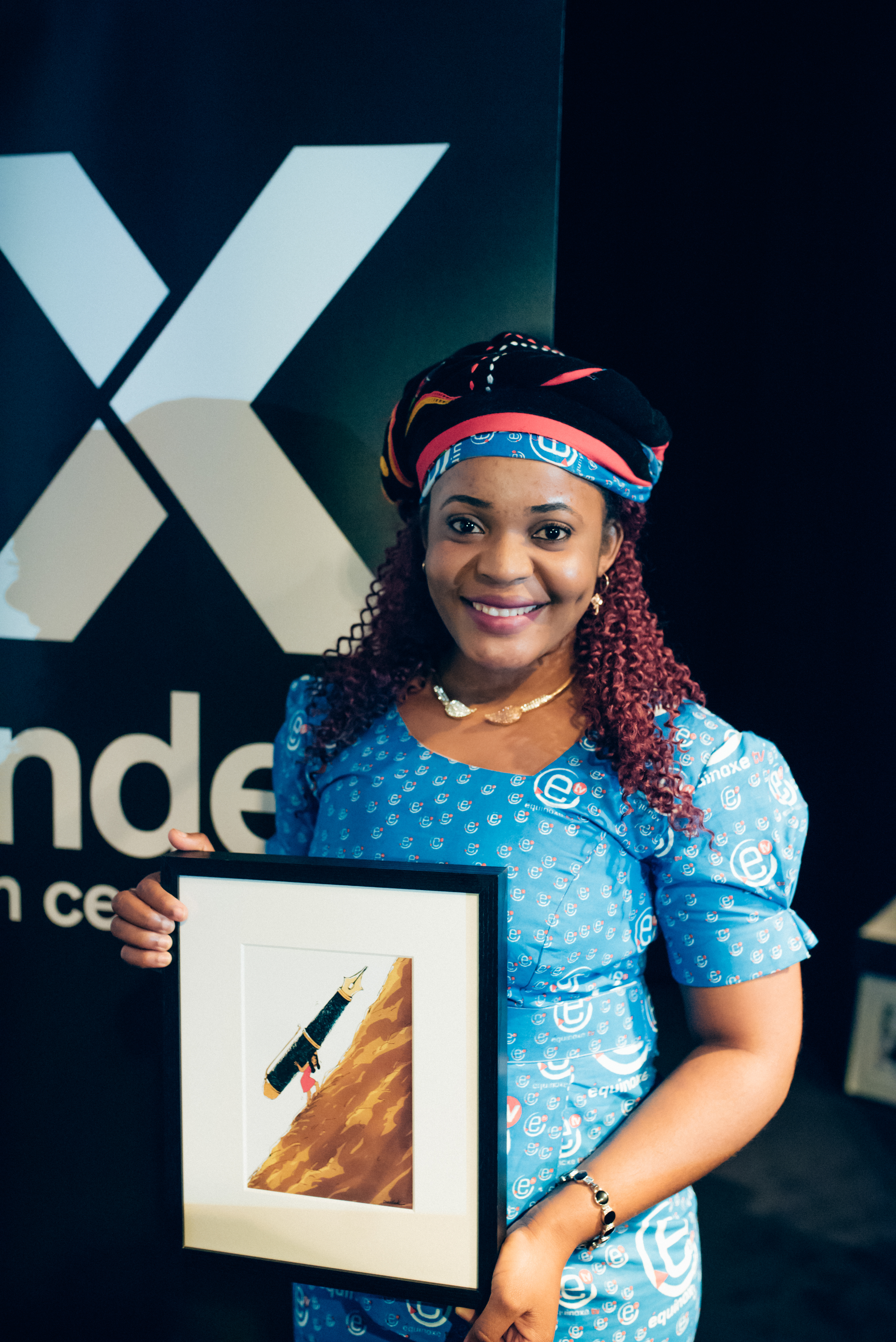
- Mimi Mefo in 2019
- Born: Mimi Mefo Takambou; 16 May 1989 (age 37); Baleng, Cameroon
- Occupation: Journalist

Mimi Mefo Newuh (born 16 May 1989; with the maiden name Takambou in Baleng, Cameroon) is a Cameroonian journalist and human rights activist who reports on the Anglophone Crisis and advocates for press freedom. She went into exile in England following a tweet related to the conflict in Cameroon and subsequent incarceration.

== Birth and education ==
Mimi Mefo Newuh was born on 16 May 1989, in Baleng near Bafoussam in the West Region of Cameroon. She studied journalism at the University of Buea, where she obtained a bachelor's degree in journalism in 2011 after completing her A-levels.

== Career ==
She began her career at HI Tv, a local television station in Buea, in the South-West Region. Later, she worked as a reporter and anchor for Equinoxe Television. In April 2018, she became the first ever female deputy editor-in-chief at the same television station, overseeing the Anglophone desk

In the same 2018 September, she established her own news platform known as Mimi Mefo Info, seeking to provide information about the ongoing issues in the Cameroon's Western regions to fellow Cameroonians and the world at large.

In February, she arrived England to begin her five-month residency with English PEN. Since her arrival, Mimi has appeared on the BBC World Service, spoken to Masters students at City and De Montfort Universities and the board of AMMPE, and also met with fellow writers and activists to discuss press freedom concerns in Cameroon and beyond.

== Arrest ==
As a result of Mimi's reports, she faced death threats, online harassment and physical surveillance.

In November 2018, she was arrested and detained for 10 days on charges of "endangering state security". She was accused of posting a tweet accusing the Cameroonian army of being responsible for the death of an American pastor in the Northwest Region of Cameroon in the context of the Anglophone Crisis. She was released after an international campaign of support. Following her release from prison after 4 days, she left Cameroon for England and was recruited by Deutsche Welle in Germany.

== Awards ==
- Index on Censorship Freedom of Expression Journalism Award in 2019.
- Best Female TV Presenter 2018/2019 in Cameroon in 2019.
- Female journalist of the year 2018 in Cameroon in 2018.

== Private life ==
Mimi Mefo married Kingsley Sheteh Newuh in the UK on 7 October 2022. They have two children.
