= Blackitude Museum =

- Musée Blackitude
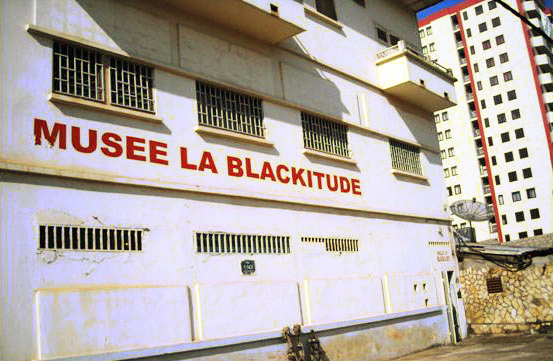
- Established: 2000
- Location: Yaoundé, Cameroon
- Coordinates: 3.864206°N 11.518345°E
- Type: Ethnographic Museum
- Collection size: 2070 objects
- Visitors: 1070 (2011)
- Director: Tchuisseu Nana Christian
- President: Fo NAB Ngo I NANA Agnes
- Curator: Kaji Appolinaire
- Website: www.blackitude.org

The Blackitude Museum is a private ethnographic institution. It is located in the city center of Yaoundé behind the Presidential Tribune on the Boulevard du 20 Mai, in the Central Region of Cameroon. The Blackitude Museum is a cultural institution that embodies the richness and diversity of Cameroonian culture. The museum project was born in March 1998 thanks to the commitment of Her Majesty Ngo Nab Fô I Nana Agnès Sunjio, founder of the museum. As part of the Bahouoc royal family, she meticulously protected and preserved the collections of art objects that were bequeathed to her by her father and by the kings of other chieftainships.

== History ==
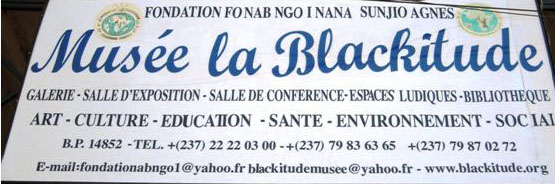
Museum signpost

Much more than a simple repository of art objects, the Blackitude Museum is an institution dedicated to the celebration, dissemination and preservation of the cultural wealth of Cameroon. Its mission is to educate and inspire on the art of Cameroon. The project that lead to the creation of the museum started in 1998 and the museum was officially in 2008. Queen Nana Agnes after receiving important pieces from the collection of her father, who was the traditional ruler of the Western Region of Cameroon (Grass Field). The rest of the collections are made up by donation and purchase. Prehistoric lithic artifacts were collected in 2009, 2010, 2011 and 2012 during field research in the Western Region of Cameroon. Some of them, such as the scrapers and the arrowheads, are copies of original lithic tools collected in the archaeological laboratories of Portugal by the curator Apollinaire Kaji in 2012.

== Acquisitions, implementation and launch ==
Acquisitions

The museum's collections are built up through donations and inheritances. In 1982, after the death of her father, Fô Nab Ngo I, Her Majesty Ngo Nab Fô I Nana Agnès Sunjio received a royal treasure, thus increasing the collection to more than 2,070 works of art.These works come from various regions of Cameroon and reflect the cultural diversity of the country.

Exhibition

Since its inauguration, the museum has been offering permanent and temporary exhibitions that highlight the many facets of Cameroonian culture. These exhibitions, organized around various themes, allow visitors to immerse themselves in the history and traditions of Cameroon.

Museum's Location

The museum is located in an old building renovated in order to create exhibition spaces and various other services. The museum is undergoing renovation work in order to comply with the standards of a modern museum institution. The aim of these works is to improve the infrastructure and create an appropriate exhibition environment for the works of art.

Launch

The museum officially opened its doors in 2008.

== Collection ==
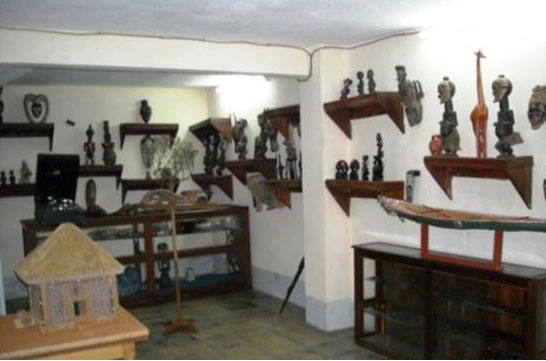
Exhibition

In 1982, after the death of her father, Queen Fo Nab Ngo I inherited the collections of the royal treasury. Since then, she has enriched this collection, bringing it to more than 2,070 works of art. This collection brings together a variety of objects mainly from the Fang Beti and Grassfields ethnic groups. In addition, this museum permanently exhibits 360 objects, divided into various categories such as statues, masks, vessels, pipes, musical instruments, paintings, emblems, architectural elements, textiles, ceremonial and ritual objects, royal furniture and royal treasures. Among the musical instruments, we find traditional guitars called "Mvet" by the peoples of the forest, the tam-tams, and the balafons. The latter symbolize the culture of the Beti peoples. The other pieces are kept in the reserves and the restoration room. These objects inform us about themes such as the traditional art of Cameroon which expresses, beyond its richness, all the formal and functional diversity of the works. The socio-religious and politico-economic institutions of the communities influence the contexts of creation of these works, grouped into ethnies. Other themes include the La'akam (initiatory stay of a new king), the dowry, or the cadi. These themes provide information on the use of certain objects, related to the different traditional rites. The iconographic part allows the reader to see and appreciate the shapes, volumes and colors of the works constituting the permanent exhibition of the museum in all their aesthetic.

== Governance ==
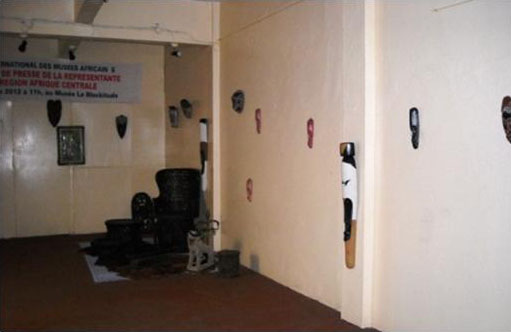
Temporary Exhibition

The museum is run by a board of trustees consisting of seven individuals:

- Chair person: Sunjio Eric,
- Founder: Queen Nana Agnes Fo Nab Ngo I.,
- General Director: Tchuisseu Nana Christian,
- Treasurer: Chantal Djomen,
- Secretary: Ateba Ossende Ghislain,
- Scientific coordinator: Joseph-Marie Essomba,
- Vice-coordinator: Kaji Appolinaire.

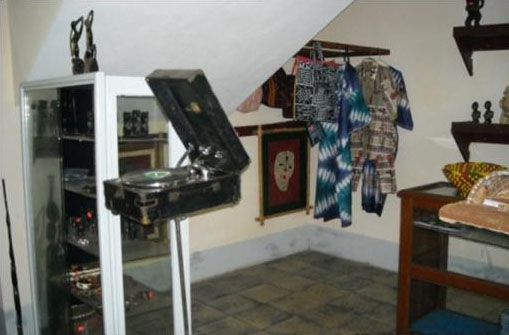
Exhibition
