= Telecommunications in Cameroon =

Telecommunications in Cameroon include radio, television, fixed and mobile telephones, and the Internet.

== History ==
During German rule, It was set up in the protectorate of Kamerun the first telegraph line, the first telephone line, and the first wireless telegraph. However, the country remained undeveloped in telecommunications. During First World War, Germans followed a scorched-earth policy that meant the destruction of communication lines, included telephone and telegraph.

In British Cameroon, from 1916 to 1950s, communications in the country relied on flag post runners that had been described as "human telephone lines". Paths followed by the runners served as a base of the development of telegraph lines in the territory. For instance, the line from Buea-Kumba to Ossidinge used the same paths that the mail runners. In the mid-1930s, the wiring of British Cameroon received more support.

== Radio and television ==
- Radio stations:
  - state-owned Cameroon Radio Television (CRTV); one private radio broadcaster; about 70 privately owned, unlicensed radio stations operating, but subject to closure at any time; foreign news services are required to partner with a state-owned national station (2007);
  - 2 AM, 9 FM, and 3 shortwave stations (2001).
- Television stations:
  - state-owned Cameroon Radio Television (CRTV), 2 private TV broadcasters (2007);
  - one station (2001).

BBC World Service radio is available via local relays (98.4 FM in Yaounde, the capital).

The government maintains tight control over broadcast media. State-owned Cameroon Radio Television (CRTV), operates both a TV and a radio network. It was the only officially recognized and fully licensed broadcaster until August 2007 when the government issued licenses to two private TV and one private radio broadcasters.

Approximately 375 privately owned radio stations were operating in 2012, three-fourths of them in Yaounde and Douala. The government requires nonprofit rural radio stations to submit applications to broadcast, but they were exempt from licensing fees. Commercial radio and television broadcasters must submit a licensing application and pay an application fee and thereafter pay a high annual licensing fee. Several rural community radio stations function with foreign funding. The government prohibits these stations from discussing politics.

In spite of the government's tight control, Reporters Without Borders reported in its 2011 field survey that "[i]t is clear from the diversity of the media and the outspoken reporting style that press freedom is a reality".

== Telephones ==
- Calling code: +237
- International call prefix: 00
- Main lines:
  - 737,400 lines in use, 88th in the world (2012);
  - 130,700 lines in use (2006).
- Mobile cellular:
  - 13.1 million lines, 64th in the world (2012);
  - 4.5 million lines (2007).
- Telephone system: system includes cable, microwave radio relay, and tropospheric scatter; Camtel, the monopoly provider of fixed-line service, provides connections for only about 3 per 100 persons; equipment is old and outdated, and connections with many parts of the country are unreliable; mobile-cellular usage, in part a reflection of the poor condition and general inadequacy of the fixed-line network, has increased sharply, reaching a subscribership base of 50 per 100 persons (2011).
- Communications cables: South Atlantic 3/West Africa Submarine Cable (SAT-3/WASC) fiber-optic cable system provides connectivity to Europe and Asia (2011); Africa Coast to Europe (ACE), cable system connecting countries along the west coast of Africa to each other and to Portugal and France, is planned.
- Satellite earth stations: 2 Intelsat (Atlantic Ocean) (2011).

== Internet ==
- Top-level domain: .cm
- Internet users:
  - 1.1 million users, 113th in the world; 5.7% of the population, 184th in the world (2012).
  - 985,565 users (2011);
  - 749,600 users, 106th in the world (2009).
- Fixed broadband: 1,006 subscriptions, 180th in the world; less than 0.05% of the population, 190th in the world (2012).
- Wireless broadband: Unknown (2012).
- Internet hosts:
  - 10,207 hosts, 134th in the world (2012);
  - 69 hosts (2008).
- IPv4: 137,728 addresses allocated, less than 0.05% of the world total, 6.8 addresses per 1000 people (2012).
- Internet service providers (ISPs):
  - Creolink Communications

A number of projects are underway that will improve Internet access, telecommunications, and Information and communications technology (ICT) in general:

- Implementation of the e-post project, connecting 234 post offices throughout the country;
- Extension of the national optical fiber network, installation of the initial 3,200 km of fiber is complete and studies for the installation of an additional 3,400 km are underway;
- Construction of multipurpose community telecentres, some 115 telecentres are operating with an additional 205 under construction;
- Construction of metropolitan optical loops, the urban optical loop of Douala is complete and construction of the Yaounde loop is underway;
- Construction of submarine cable landing points;
- Establishment of public key infrastructure (PKI);
- Construction of a regional technology park to support the development of ICTs.

=== Internet censorship and surveillance ===
There are no government restrictions on access to the Internet or reports that the government monitors e-mail or Internet chat rooms.

Although the law provides for freedom of speech and press, it also criminalizes media offenses, and the government restricts freedoms of speech and press. Government officials threaten, harass, arrest, and deny equal treatment to individuals or organizations that criticize government policies or express views at odds with government policy. Individuals who criticize the government publicly or privately sometimes face reprisals. Press freedom is constrained by strict libel laws that suppress criticism. These laws authorize the government, at its discretion and the request of the plaintiff, to criminalize a civil libel suit or to initiate a criminal libel suit in cases of alleged libel against the president and other high government officials. Such crimes are punishable by prison terms and heavy fines.

Although the constitution and law prohibit arbitrary interference with privacy, family, home, or correspondence, these rights are subject to restriction for the "higher interests of the state", and there are credible reports that police and gendarmes harass citizens, conduct searches without warrants, and open or seize mail with impunity.

== See also ==
- Cameroon Radio Television, government-controlled national broadcaster.
- Commonwealth Telecommunications Organisation
- List of terrestrial fibre optic cable projects in Africa
- Media of Cameroon
- Cameroon
