= Cameroon Tribune =

Newspaper in Cameroon

Cameroon tribune
- Language: French
- Headquarters: Yaoundé
- City: Yaoundé
- Country: Cameroon
- Website: https://www.cameroon-tribune.cm/

The Cameroon Tribune is a major newspaper in Cameroon. It is also available online. It is owned by the government. It was founded in 1974 by the Societé de Presse et d'Editions du Cameroun (SOPECAM). The French version became the only daily newspaper in the country.

== See also ==
- Media of Cameroon
