= L'Expression de Mamy-Wata =

Weekly satirical newspaper published in Cameroon

L'Expression de Mamy-Wata, often referred to as simply Mamy-Wata, is a weekly satirical newspaper published in Cameroon by the media company La Nouvelle Expression. The paper is written in French peppered with loan words from Cameroonian Pidgin English. In 1999, it had a weekly circulation of 4,000 copies.

On 4 January 1999, Cameroonian Police confiscated 2,000 to 2,500 copies of Mamy-Wata in Douala. La Nouvelle Expression reported that the newspapers were seized in response to a cartoon in the 29 December issue depicting Paul Biya, Cameroon's president, in a spat with his wife. Reports differ on whether the police ever provided an official justification for the seizure; the Committee to Protect Journalists reported that none was provided, but the International Press Institute reported that authorities claimed the newspapers were a "breach of public order". Scholar George Echu has claimed that the incident added Mamy-Wata to "the pantheon of Africa's satirical heavyweights."
