= André Van Steirteghem =

Belgian fertility researcher

- Born: March 26, 1940 (age 86)
- Known for: Development of intracytoplasmic sperm injection
- Scientific career
- Fields: Reproductive medicine, assisted reproductive technology, clinical embryology
- Workplaces: Vrije Universiteit Brussel, UZ Brussel

André C. Van Steirteghem (born 1940) is a Belgian physician, medical researcher and professor emeritus associated with the Vrije Universiteit Brussel (VUB) and UZ Brussel. He is best known as one of the pioneers of reproductive medicine in Belgium and for his role in the development of intracytoplasmic sperm injection (ICSI), an assisted reproductive technique in which a single sperm cell is injected directly into an oocyte.

Van Steirteghem co-founded the fertility clinic at the VUB and worked with colleagues including Paul Devroey, Gianpiero D. Palermo and Hubert Joris on the clinical development of ICSI. Brussels IVF describes Van Steirteghem and Devroey as two founding figures of its fertility centre, and its assisted reproductive technology training centre is named after them.

== Career ==
Van Steirteghem was originally trained as a paediatrician and became active in fertility research at the Vrije Universiteit Brussel. He was involved in the establishment and development of the VUB fertility clinic, which became part of the Centre for Reproductive Medicine at UZ Brussel.

At the VUB and UZ Brussel, his work focused on assisted reproductive technology, gametes, preimplantation embryos, in vitro fertilisation, micromanipulation, cryobiology and preimplantation diagnosis.

Van Steirteghem also held leadership roles in reproductive medicine. He served as chair of the European Society of Human Reproduction and Embryology (ESHRE) from 1991 to 1993. ESHRE later listed him among its honorary members in 2007.

== Intracytoplasmic sperm injection ==
Van Steirteghem is closely associated with the early clinical development of intracytoplasmic sperm injection (ICSI). The first report of pregnancies after intracytoplasmic injection of a single spermatozoon into an oocyte was published in The Lancet in 1992 by Gianpiero Palermo, Hubert Joris, Paul Devroey and Van Steirteghem. The paper reported the use of ICSI in couples with severe male-factor infertility after previous assisted-fertilisation methods had failed.

A larger early clinical series was published in Human Reproduction in 1993. In that study, Van Steirteghem and colleagues reported high fertilisation and implantation rates after ICSI in couples who had failed conventional in vitro fertilisation or who had not been accepted for IVF because of insufficient motile spermatozoa.

ICSI became an important treatment for severe male-factor infertility and is now widely used in assisted reproduction.

== Research ==
Van Steirteghem's research has covered gametes and preimplantation embryos, in vitro fertilisation, micromanipulation, cryobiology and preimplantation diagnosis. He published extensively on assisted reproductive technology, including ICSI and the health and development of children conceived through fertility treatment.

He was also associated with the journal Human Reproduction. Articles published by Oxford University Press in 2008 and 2009 list him as editor-in-chief of the journal.

== Recognition ==
In 2025, the Vrije Universiteit Brussel announced the Liebaers–Van Steirteghem Award, named after Van Steirteghem and the medical geneticist Inge Liebaers. The university described Van Steirteghem as a pioneer in fertility research and co-founder of the fertility clinic at the VUB.

== Selected publications ==
- Palermo, G.; Joris, H.; Devroey, P.; Van Steirteghem, A. C. "Pregnancies after intracytoplasmic injection of single spermatozoon into an oocyte." The Lancet. 340 (8810): 17–18. 1992. doi:10.1016/0140-6736(92)92425-F.
- Van Steirteghem, A. C.; Nagy, Z.; Joris, H.; Liu, J.; Staessen, C.; Smitz, J.; Wisanto, A.; Devroey, P. "High fertilization and implantation rates after intracytoplasmic sperm injection." Human Reproduction. 8 (7): 1061–1066. 1993. doi:10.1093/oxfordjournals.humrep.a138192.
- Van Steirteghem, A.; Devroey, P.; Liebaers, I. "Intracytoplasmic sperm injection." Molecular and Cellular Endocrinology. 186 (2): 199–203. 2002. doi:10.1016/S0303-7207(01)00658-X.

== See also ==
- Assisted reproductive technology
- In vitro fertilisation
- Intracytoplasmic sperm injection
- Preimplantation genetic diagnosis
- Paul Devroey
- Gianpiero D. Palermo
- UZ Brussel
- Vrije Universiteit Brussel
