= Bonakouamouang Chimney =

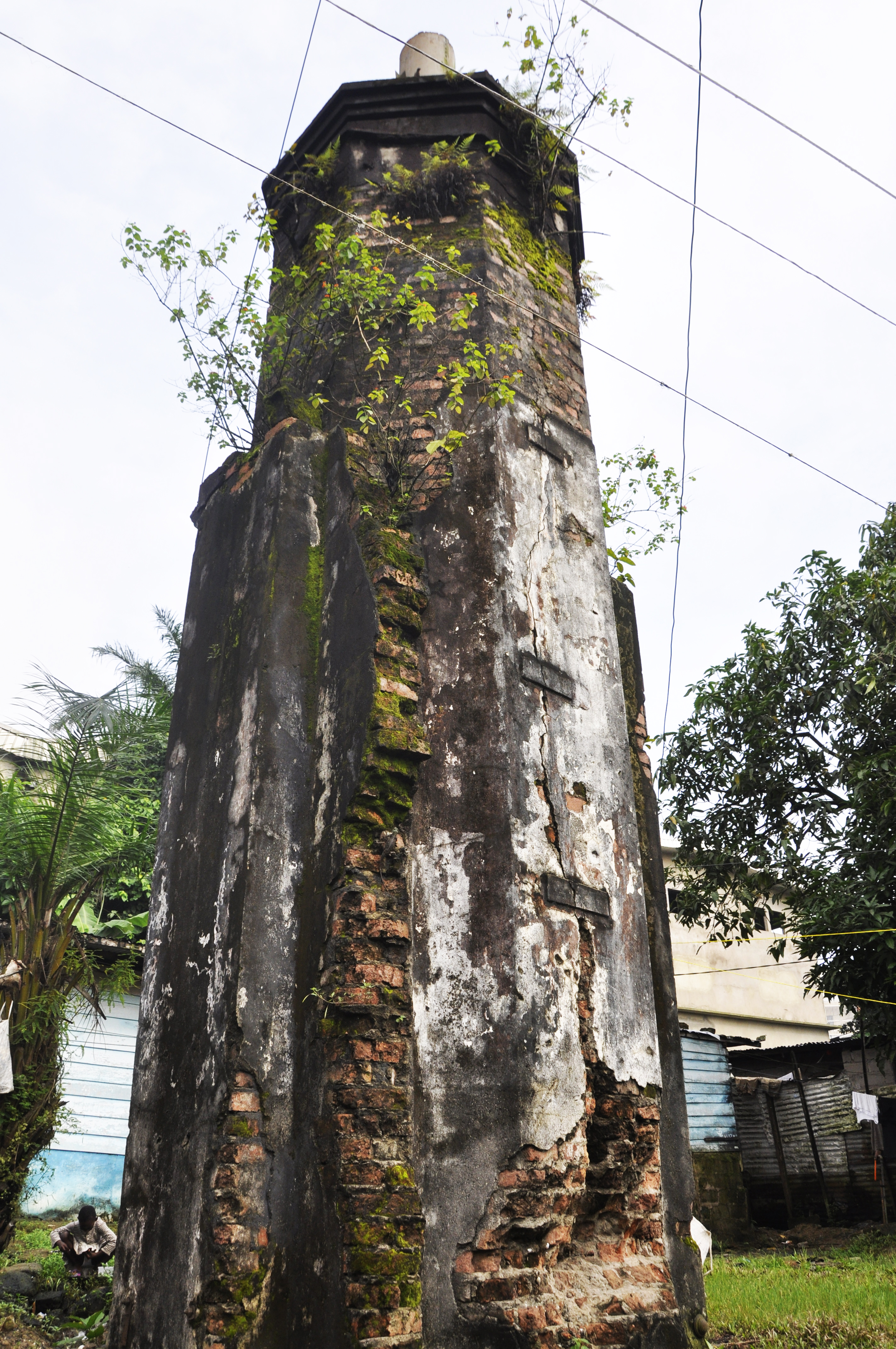
- Interactive map of the Bonakouamouang Chimney area

General information
- Type: industrial building, chimney
- Architectural style: German colonial industrial architecture
- Location: Douala, Cameroon
- Coordinates: 4.054416°N 9.706756°E
- Completed: 19th century
- Client: The German government

The Bonakouamouang Chimney – situated in Douala, Cameroon in the district of Akwa neighborhood of Bessegue – is a relict of the waterworks built by the Germans at the beginning of the 19th century. The waterworks was part of the first phase of industrial investments aimed at the urbanisation of Kamerunstadt (Douala).

The supply of running water was necessary to allow the implementation of the major development works which would radically transform the traditional village of Douala into an urban agglomeration of administrative and commercial buildings, private residences, places of worship and schools. The urban plan of von Brautisch, head of Kamerunstadt district under the government of Jesko von Puttkamer (1895–1907), changed the local way of life and economy: wide streets were opened up, the Bonaku (Akwatown) marshes were drained, an embankment was built providing a route between Bonanjo and Akwa, the harbour area was expanded... henceforward denying fishermen any direct access to the river. The railway infrastructure created from the beginning of the 20th century was to develop communications with the country's interior. Thus the Besséké valley became home to the first station on the town's left bank, in the port area. From 1909 the Northern railway line was completed, linking Bonabéri and Nkongsamba. Work on the line joining Douala and Yaoundé began at the end of 1910-beginning of 1911.

Requisitioned as forced labour for these undertakings, the human cost of laying the foundations for the new colonial economy was a high one for the local workforce.

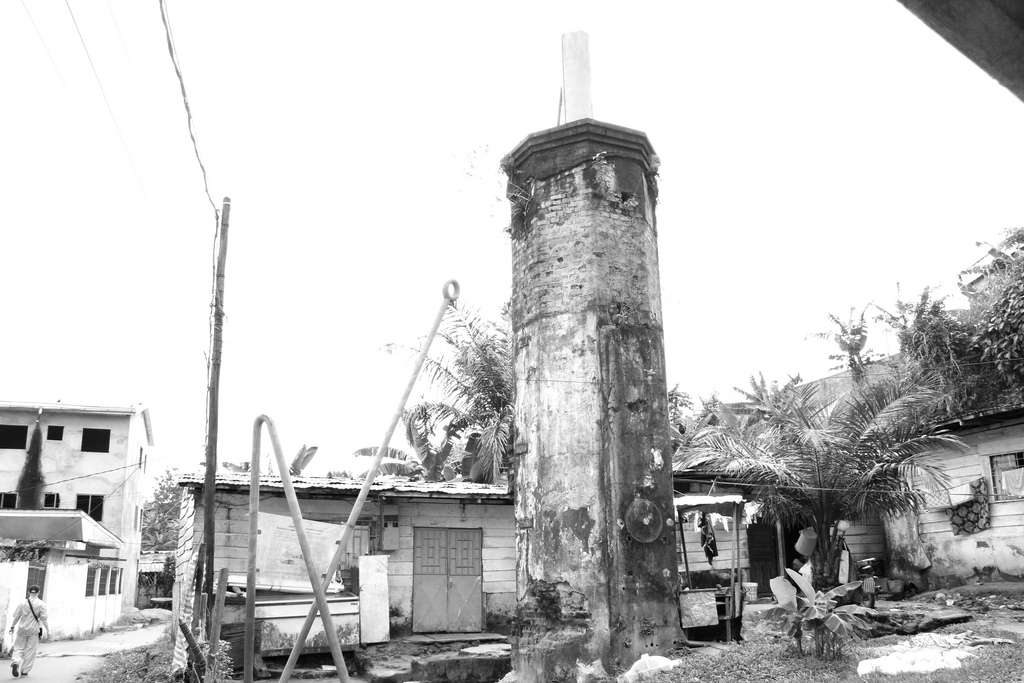
Photo by Roberto Paci Dalò, 2010

In 2006 the building is highlighted by an urban sign produced by doual'art and designed by Sandrine Dole; the sign presents an historical image of the building and a description of its history.

== See also ==
- Kamerun
