= Gaëtan Bong =

Cameroonian footballer (born 1988)

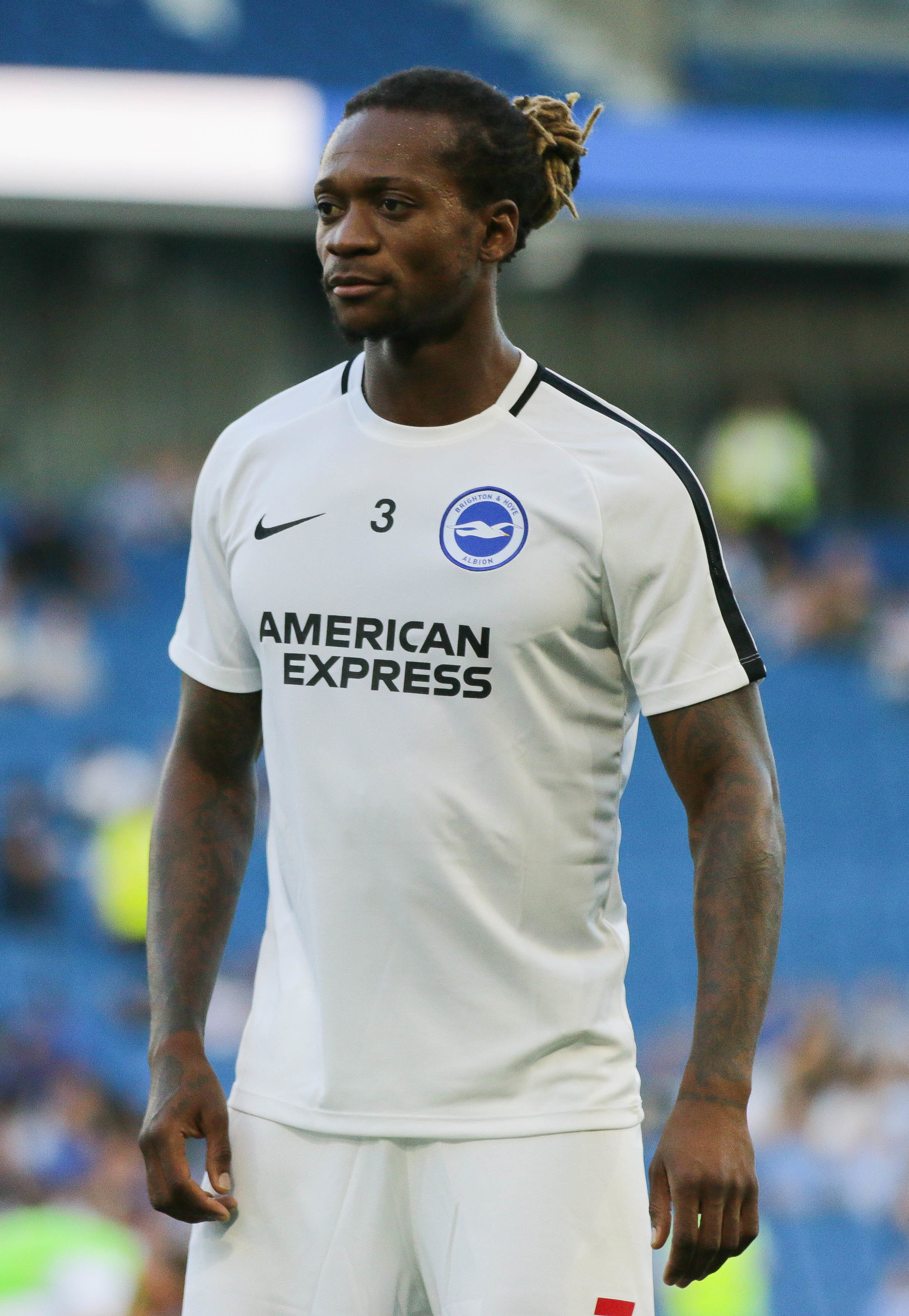
- Bong warming up for Brighton & Hove Albion in 2018

Personal information
- Full name: Thomas Gaëtan Bong
- Date of birth: 25 April 1988 (age 38)
- Place of birth: Sackbayeme, Cameroon
- Height: 1.83 m (6 ft 0 in)
- Position: Left back

Youth career
- 2002–2006: Metz

Senior career*
Years	Team	Apps	(Gls)
2006–2009	Metz	16	(0)
2008–2009	→ Tours (loan)	34	(0)
2009–2013	Valenciennes	109	(3)
2013–2014	Olympiacos	19	(0)
2014-2015	Wigan Athletic	14	(0)
2015–2020	Brighton & Hove Albion	91	(0)
2020–2022	Nottingham Forest	18	(0)
Total		301	(3)

International career
2009	France U21	1	(0)
2010–2019	Cameroon	16	(0)
- * Club domestic league appearances and goals

Thomas Gaëtan Bong (born 25 April 1988) is a Cameroonian former professional footballer who played as a left back. He has made 16 appearances for the Cameroon national team. He previously played at senior level for Metz, Tours, Valenciennes, Olympiacos, Wigan Athletic, Brighton & Hove Albion, Nottingham Forest and represented France at under-21 level, before switching his allegiance to Cameroon.

== Career ==
=== FC Metz ===
Bong was born in Sackbayeme, the hometown of renowned goalkeeper Jacques Songo'o. He began his career in Metz's youth ranks at age fourteen, having started out at La Madine Training Centre in his native Cameroon.

Bong was part of the FC Metz youth side when he helped the team win the 25th edition of the "Mondial de la Saint-Pierre" by beating FC Nantes on penalties on 22 April 2002. While progressing the youth team, Olivier Perrin commented about Bong, saying: "He's a real competitor. He still has a lot of work to do, especially on the technical side. Physically, he is able to repeat high-level efforts. But its main quality is to succeed in making the most of its potential." In July 2005, he was one of the four players to receive the BEP LEC following his exam results.

In October 2005, Bong suffered an injury during training that required stitches. Two months later, he was called up to the first team for the first time at age seventeen. Bong made his FC Metz debut against Sochaux on 10 December 2005, starting the whole game, in a 1–1 draw. He appeared two more matches later in the 2005–06 season. However, he was plagued with injuries that saw him sidelined for the rest of the 2005–06 season. Despite this, Bong signed his first professional contract with the club.

Bong continued to recover from his injuries at the start of the 2006–07 season, playing for the club's reserves side to gain playing time. He returned to the first team on 20 October 2006 as a late substitute in a 2–0 win over Guingamp. Bong made another start in a 0–0 draw against FC Istres on 22 December 2006. However, Bong was dropped from the first team and never played again, due to his first team opportunities, as well as, his own injury concern. At the end of the 2006–07 season, Bong had made two appearances in all competitions.

Bong continued to recover from his injuries at the start of the 2007–08 season. He made his first appearances of the season on 27 October 2007 as a substitute in the second half of a 0–0 draw against AS Nancy. Bong started the next game, a 0–0 draw with Toulouse. He kept his first team place, playing in the left–back position, for a few weeks, but found his first team opportunities limited for the rest of the 2007–08 season. As a result, Bong played in the club's reserves side in a number of matches. During the 2007–08 season, he made 12 appearances in all competitions.

Bong was loaned out for the 2008–09 season to Ligue 2 club Tours. He made his FC Tours debut against Dijon FCO on 22 August 2008, coming on as a substitute in just 18 minutes from the game, in a 2–1 loss. Bong then quickly established himself in the starting eleven for the side and went on to make thirty–six appearances in all competitions.

=== Valenciennes ===
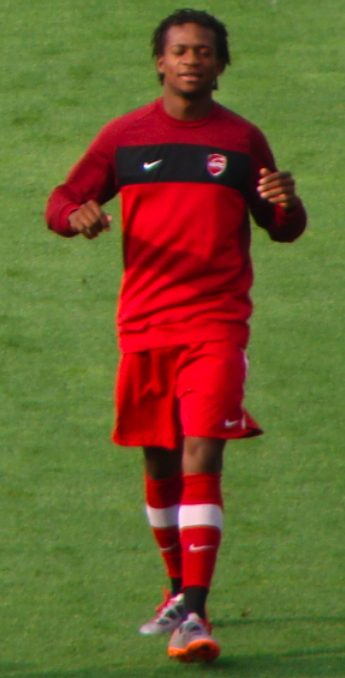
Bong warming up for Valenciennes in 2010.

On 29 July 2009, the 21-year-old left Metz to sign a four-year deal with Valenciennes for £595,000.

Bong made his Valenciennes debut, coming on as a late substitute, in a 3–1 loss against AS Nancy in the opening game of the season. He quickly became a first team regular for the side. Bong played against his former club, FC Metz, for the first time in the round of 16 of Coupe de la Ligue, as they lost 2–0 on 22 September 2009. He scored his first goal for Valenciennes, in a 2–0 win over US Boulogne on 20 January 2010. A month later, Bong kept two clean sheets in two matches between 20 February 2010 and 27 February 2010 against Grenoble Foot 38 and Saint-Étienne. He scored his second goal of the season on 5 May 2010 in a 2–2 draw against Paris Saint-Germain. During the 2009–10 season, Bong made 31 appearances and scored twice in all competitions.

Bong continued to remain in the first team for the side at the start of the 2010–11 season. He then scored his first goal of the season, in a 1–1 draw against Lyon on 11 September 2010. Shortly after, Bong served a two match suspension by the Disciplinary Commission of the LFP, due to the incident he was involved during a 3–2 win over Marseille on 14 August 2010. Bong returned from suspension and continued to feature in the first team for the side. He scored his second goal of the season and set up one of the goals, in a 4–0 win over US Boulogne in the round of 16 of the Coupe de la Ligue. But his return was short–lived when he suffered a knee injury that saw him sidelined for two months. He returned to the first team on 29 January 2011, starting in a 2–1 win over Lyon. However, during a 2–2 draw against SM Caen on 19 February 2011, Bong suffered a muscular injury to the adductors that saw him sidelined for several weeks. By April, he returned to training and made his return from injury against Arles-Avignon on 17 April 2011 and set up a goal for Grégory Pujol to score the only goal of the game. Since returning from injury, Bong, once again, regained his first team place for the remaining matches of the 2010–11 season. Bong then kept two clean sheets in two matches between 8 May 2011 and 11 May 2011. At the end of the 2010–11 season, Bong went on to make twenty–four appearances and scoring two times in all competitions.

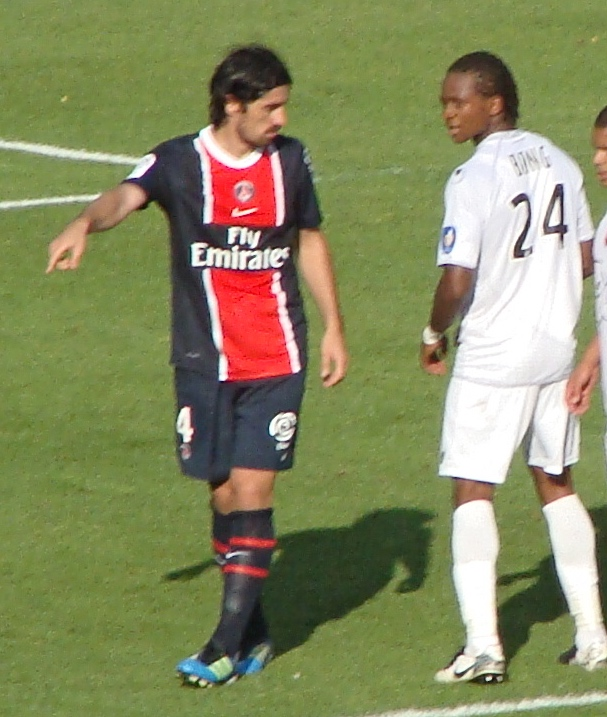
Bong playing against his former Valenciennes teammate, Milan Biševac in 2011.

Ahead of the 2011–12 season, Bong was linked with a move to Ligue 1 side Stade Rennais but stayed at the club in the end. He continued to establish himself in the first team for the side at the start of the 2011–12 season. For his performance, Bong signed a contract extension with the club, keeping him until 2014. During a 3–0 win against Sochaux on 16 October 2011, he set up the opening goal for Vincent Aboubakar. However, Bong suffered an injury that saw him sidelined throughout November. He made his return from injury on 3 December 2011, starting in a 2–1 loss against Évian. Bong continued to regain his first team place despite suffering from a thigh injury along the way. However, during a 2–1 loss against Saint-Étienne on 10 March 2012, Bong suffered a foot injury that saw him sidelined for a month. He came on as a late substitute in a 2–0 win over OGC Nice on 29 April 2012. Over the 2011–12 season, Bong made 30 appearances in all competitions.

At the start of the 2012–13 season, Bong suffered ankle injury, having sustained an injury in the club's pre–season friendly. He made his return on 22 September 2012 as a second–half substitute in a 2–1 loss against Stade Brestois 29. Since returning to the first team, Bong regained his place for the rest of the 2012–13 season. During a 1–0 win over Stade de Reims on 3 December 2012, he set up a goal for Foued Kadir to score the only goal of the game. Bong then kept three clean sheets between 12 April 2013 and 27 April 2013 for the side. At the end of the 2012–13 season, he went on to make thirty–one appearances in all competitions.

Bong made his only appearance of the 2013–14 season, keeping a clean sheet, in a 3–0 win over Toulouse in the opening game of the season. By the time he departed the club, Bong made 117 overall appearances for the club and scored four goals.

=== Olympiacos ===
On 19 August 2013, he signed a contract with Olympiacos for £850,000, signing a three–year contract. Bong was previously linked with a move to Olympiacos, who was interested in signing him.

Bong made his Olympiacos debut, starting the whole game in the left–back position, in a 2–1 win over Atromitos on 25 August 2013. This was followed up by keeping two clean sheets in the next two matches. Three days later on 17 September 2013, he made his UEFA Champions League debut in a 4–1 loss against Paris Saint-Germain and went on to make four appearances in the UEFA Champions League. However, Bong was sidelined for two months, due to sustaining ankle and foot injuries. He returned as a late substitute in a 4–0 win against rivals' PAOK on 10 November. Bong then set up a goal for Alejandro Domínguez to score the club's third goal of the game, in a 3–0 win over Ergotelis on 1 December 2013. A month later on 8 January 2014, he scored his first goal for the club, in a 4–0 against Asteras Tripolis in the Greek Cup. During a 2–0 win over Skoda Xanthi on 26 January 2014, Bong received a racist abuse from Skoda Xanthi's supporters; after the match, he condemned the action via his social media account. From 1 December 2013 to 26 January 2014, Bong helped the side keep eight consecutive clean sheets, which he played six matches. Throughout the 2013–14 season, Bong was the first choice left–back position despite being placed on the substitute bench. At the end of the 2013–14 season, making twenty–eight appearances and scoring once in all competitions, he helped Olympiacos win their 41st Super League Greece title this season.

However, in the 2014–15 season, Bong found his first team opportunities at Olympiacos limited, due to fallen out of favour under the new management of Michel and was expected to leave over the summer, which never happened. It was announced on 30 January 2015 that Olympiacos has terminated a contract of Bong.

=== Wigan Athletic ===
On 2 February 2015, Bong signed for English club Wigan Athletic on a short-term contract.

He made his Wigan Athletic debut, starting the whole game, in a 1–0 loss against Cardiff City on 24 February 2015. Since joining the club, Bong quickly became a first team regular for the side, playing in the left–back position. However, Wigan's relegation from the Championship was confirmed on 28 April 2015. At the end of the 2014–15 season, making fourteen appearances, Bong was released at the end of the season.

=== Brighton & Hove Albion ===
It was announced on 2 July 2015 that Bong joined EFL Championship side Brighton & Hove Albion on a free transfer, signing an initial two-year contract with the south coast club. Upon signing for the club, he revealed that he rejected a "lucrative offers from at France and abroad" to join Brighton & Hove Albion. Bong was also given a number twelve shirt for the new season as well.

Bong made his Brighton & Hove Albion debut in the opening game of the season, starting the whole game, in a 1–0 win over Nottingham Forest. Since joining the club, he appeared regularly for the club, playing in the left–back position. In a match against Ipswich Town on 29 August 2015, Bong set up the first goal of the game for Kazenga LuaLua, in a 3–2 win. Bong also played a role when he set up the winning goal for Bobby Zamora, in a 2–1 win over Leeds United on 17 October 2015. This lasted until tearing his tendon during a 0–0 draw against Preston North End on 24 October 2015, ruling him out for 21 games throughout the season. By February, Bong returned to full training. However, because Liam Rosenior was the first choice left–back position in Bong's absent, he appeared as a substitute for the rest of the season, making three appearances He also played in the playoffs, as the club lost to Sheffield Wednesday in the semi-finals 3–1 on aggregate. Despite this, Bong finished his 2015–16 season, making nineteen appearances in all competitions.

Ahead of the 2016–17 season, Bong switched number shirt to three. Bong started the season well when he helped the side keep four clean sheets in the first four matches of the season. Bong continued to regain his first team place for the side, playing in the left–back position. He started every match since the start of the 2016–17 season until he was suspended for having five yellow cards. After serving a one match suspension, Bong returned to the starting line-up against Sheffield Wednesday on 1 October 2016 and set up a goal for Anthony Knockaert to score the club's second goal of the game, in a 2–1 win. Two weeks later, on 18 October 2016, he set up a goal for Sam Baldock to score the only goal of the game, in a 1–0 win over Wolverhampton Wanderers. However, during a 0–0 draw against Cardiff City on 3 December 2016, Bong was sent–off for a second bookable offence. A month later, he suffered persistent injuries that kept him out for three months. Because of this, he was not included in the squad for much of the second half apart from three games: a victory against Birmingham City, another against Wigan, and a loss to Bristol City. Brighton finished the season as runners up to Newcastle United, gaining automatic promotion to the Premier League. At the end of the 2016–17 season, making twenty–eight appearances in all competitions, Bong's contract was due to expire at the end of the season, however, he signed a new one-year contract with the club as Brighton aim to survive their first Premier League season.

In the 2017–18 season, Bong played two matches for Brighton in the EFL Cup, the second a 1–0 away defeat against AFC Bournemouth. However, his first team opportunities at the club was limited, due to Markus Suttner being preferred at the first choice left–back position, as well as, his own injury concern. He made his Premier League debut in a 2–0 away defeat against Arsenal on 1 October 2017. He started for Albion in their next five league games as they embarked on an unbeaten run that saw the club reach as high as 8th place in the Premier League. On 25 November 2017, Bong was involved in an incident with Manchester United striker Romelu Lukaku in Brighton's 1–0 league defeat at Old Trafford, where Lukaku attempted to kick Bong twice in Brighton's penalty area. Lukaku ultimately did not face retrospective action for the incident, with referee Neil Swarbrick's report confirming that he had not seen the incident, but the FA panel could not reach a unanimous verdict. For the next months, he found himself in and out of the first team, due to his own injury concern once again. Bong accused Jay Rodriguez of making a racist remark during a 2–0 defeat at West Bromwich Albion on 13 January 2018. The West Brom forward was charged by the Football Association on 8 February in relation to the incident. The charges were later found not proven by the F.A. due to lack of evidence, but the FA was "completely satisfied" Bong's complaint was "made in absolute good faith" and "there has been no suggestion that this was a malicious or fabricated complaint". Amid to the incident, Bong regained his first team place from Suttner for the left–back position for the rest of the season. On 28 February 2018, Bong signed a one-year contract extension, committing him to Brighton until 30 June 2019. During a 0–0 draw against Burnley on 28 April 2018, he was booed by Burnley's supporters, chanting "Jay Rodriguez (who used to play for Burnley), he's one of our own" and booing him whenever he touched the ball. After the match, Manager Chris Hughton, the FA and anti-racist organisation Kick It Out condemned the actions from Burnley's supporters. On 4 May 2018, Bong played in the 1–0 home win over Manchester United which secured The Albion's Premier League survival with two games remaining, as well as, keeping another clean sheet. At the end of the 2017–18 season, he went on to make twenty–four appearances in all competitions.

Ahead of the 2018–19 season, Bong was expected to compete with new signing Bernardo over the left–back position. Despite this, Bong played the whole match where Brighton & Hove Albion beat Manchester United at home for the second season running on 19 August 2018. The game finished 3–2 to the Albion, giving their first win of the season. He continued to regain his left–back position at the start of the season, beating off competition from Bernando. Bong helped the side keep three clean sheets throughout October, as Brighton & Hove Albion won all three league matches. His run starting in the left–back last until mid–November when he was dropped to the substitute bench in favour of Bernando. But Bong regained his first team place, playing in the left–back position at the start of January following Bernando's injury. During a 2–1 loss against Manchester United on 19 January 2019, he gave away a penalty, leading Paul Pogba to successfully convert the penalty to give the opposition team a 1–0 lead. In February 2019, two Burnley fans were accused of using racist slurs against Bong and homophobic slurs against Brigton fans. Their criminal trial collapsed in October 2019. At the beginning of March, Bernando returned to the starting lineup, leading Bong to return to the substitute bench. Despite this, Bong played in two FA Cup matches this season as The Seagulls reached the semi-final. During a FA Cup match against West Brom, Bong, once again, was subjected of derogatory chant by West Brom fans. As a result of facing competition for a place in the side from teammate from Bernando throughout the 2018–19 season, they both started 19 league games and coming on as subs on 3 occasions. Brighton finished 17th in the table as they secured their Premier League status. At the end of the 2018–19 season, making twenty–four appearances in all competitions, Bong signed a one-year contract extension, until June 2020.

Bong's first appearance under their new manager, Graham Potter came on 27 August 2019 where Brighton beat Bristol Rovers 2–1 away from home in the EFL Cup. His first league appearance of the season came on 14 September coming on as a substitute in a 1–1 home draw against Burnley. He made his 100th appearance for the Sussex club on 28 September coming on as a substitute in a 2–0 away defeat to Chelsea in what also happened to be his 50th Premier League appearance. However, his first team opportunities at the club continued to be limited, due to a strong competition in the left–back position. In a FA Cup third round match against Sheffield Wednesday, Bong made his first start for Brighton, starting a match and played 71 minutes, as the club lost 1–0, in what turned out to be his last appearance. During the match, he was subjected of booing by Brighton supporters when he was substituted and their actions was condemned by the club in a statement. By the time Bong left Brighton, he made seven appearances for the club in all competitions.

=== Nottingham Forest ===
On 30 January 2020, Bong left Brighton and signed for Nottingham Forest on a two-and-a-half-year deal. He made his debut for the club in a 1–0 defeat to Charlton Athletic on 11 February 2020. Poor defensive play from Bong was judged to be a significant cause of Charlton's goal, and Bong's 59th minute substitution was described as 'an act of mercy' by The Athletic reporter Nick Miller. Subsequently, Bong did not feature in any of Sabri Lamouchi's match day squads for the rest of his tenure as Forest manager. At the start of the 2020–21 season, Bong was told that he was free to leave the club. He was not given a shirt number and trained separately from the other players.

After Lamouchi's sacking, Bong was brought back into Forest's first team plans by new manager Chris Hughton, who had previously won promotion alongside him with Brighton & Hove Albion. He made his first start under Hughton on 31 October 2020, in a 1–0 defeat to Middlesbrough. However, Bong's return was short–lived when he found himself placed on the substitute bench, due to the competition in the club's defence, as well as his own injury concern. His next appearance came in the new year on 20 January 2021, coming on as an 81st-minute substitute in an eventual 3–1 home victory over Millwall in the league. Bong made his second start under Hughton on 23 January in a FA Cup fourth round tie at Swansea City in which Forest lost 5–1. On 6 February, Bong earned his first assist for Forest setting up former Brighton teammate Glenn Murray's first goal for the club, in a match where also his former Brighton teammate Anthony Knockaert scored a goal in the 3–0 away win over Wycombe Wanderers. At the end of the 2020–21 season, Bong was told that he was not in Hughton's plans and was free to leave the club.

Although Bong was not in Hughton's plans, he started in Forest's opening game of the 2021–22 season away at Coventry City on 8 August where they fell to a 2–1 defeat as the home team returned to their stadium after 833 days. Three days later it was confirmed that Bong had been given a three match ban as a result of violent conduct during the Coventry loss. Bong was caught on camera striking opponent Callum O'Hare in the face during a set piece. He returned from suspension on 21 August playing in the whole match of the 1–0 away loss at Stoke City. Seven days later, Bong assisted Brennan Johnson's 82nd-minute equaliser in the 1–1 away draw against Derby County. On 29 May, Forest beat Huddersfield in the Championship play-off final to earn promotion to the Premier League, however Bong was not involved. He made only seven appearances all season, his last coming on 6 January and on 10 June it was announced that Bong would leave the side on the expiry of his contract.

== International career ==
Bong was eligible to play for either France, where he grew up, or Cameroon, where he was born and has a Franco-Cameroonian nationality. Having previously represented the youth system for France, Bong played one international match for the France U21, before opting to play for Cameroon.

Bong was named in Paul Le Guen's final 23-man roster for the 2010 World Cup in South Africa. Bong played one match for Cameroon in the 2010 FIFA World Cup in Cameroon's last group match against the Netherlands, where Cameroon lost 2–1. Cameroon lost all three group games, finishing bottom of Group E of the 2010 FIFA World Cup. Four years later, he didn't make the cut for the 2014 World Cup in Brazil. Bong spent four years away from Cameroon, due to a dispute with the Cameroonian Football Association. As a result, he didn't get a call up from the national side until September 2018. He was in the starting lineup in the 1–1 draw against Comoros on 8 September. Two months later on 20 November 2018 against Brazil, Bong captained the Cameroon team for the first time in the 1–0 loss.

Bong was included in the Cameroon squad for the 2019 Africa Cup of Nations. The defending champions, Cameroon beat Guinea-Bissau 2–0 in their opening group game with Bong an unused substitute. Bong started in their next group stage match against Ghana where it finished 0–0.

== Career statistics ==
=== Club ===
Appearances and goals by club, season and competition
Club	Season	League			National Cup		League Cup		Other		Total	
Club	Season	Division	Apps	Goals	Apps	Goals	Apps	Goals	Apps	Goals	Apps	Goals
Metz	2005–06	Ligue 1	3	0	1	0	0	0	—		4	0
Metz	2006–07	Ligue 2	2	0	2	0	0	0	—		4	0
Metz	2007–08	Ligue 1	11	0	0	0	1	0	—		12	0
Metz	Total		16	0	3	0	1	0	—		20	0
Tours (loan)	2008–09	Ligue 2	34	0	1	0	1	0	—		36	0
Valenciennes	2009–10	Ligue 1	29	2	1	0	1	0	—		31	2
Valenciennes	2010–11	Ligue 1	22	1	1	0	1	1	—		24	2
Valenciennes	2011–12	Ligue 1	28	0	2	0	0	0	—		30	0
Valenciennes	2012–13	Ligue 1	29	0	1	0	1	0	—		31	0
Valenciennes	2013–14	Ligue 1	1	0	—		—		—		1	0
Valenciennes	Total		109	3	5	0	3	1	—		117	4
Olympiacos	2013–14	Super League Greece	19	0	5	1	—		4 (Note: Appearances in UEFA Champions League)	0	28	1
Wigan Athletic	2014–15	Championship	14	0	—		—		—		14	0
Brighton & Hove Albion	2015–16	Championship	16	0	0	0	1	0	2 (Note: Appearances in Championship play-offs)	0	19	0
Brighton & Hove Albion	2016–17	Championship	24	0	0	0	0	0	—		24	0
Brighton & Hove Albion	2017–18	Premier League	25	0	1	0	2	0	—		28	0
Brighton & Hove Albion	2018–19	Premier League	22	0	2	0	0	0	—		24	0
Brighton & Hove Albion	2019–20	Premier League	4	0	1	0	2	0	—		7	0
Brighton & Hove Albion	Total		91	0	4	0	5	0	2	0	102	0
Nottingham Forest	2019–20	Championship	1	0	0	0	0	0	—		1	0
Nottingham Forest	2020–21	Championship	10	0	1	0	0	0	—		11	0
Nottingham Forest	2021–22	Championship	7	0	0	0	0	0	—		7	0
Nottingham Forest	Total		18	0	1	0	0	0	—		19	0
Career total			301	3	19	1	10	1	6	0	336	5

=== International ===
Appearances and goals by national team and year
National team	Year	Apps	Goals
Cameroon	2010	4	0
Cameroon	2011	5	0
Cameroon	2012	1	0
Cameroon	2013	1	0
Cameroon	2014	1	0
Cameroon	2018	1	0
Cameroon	2019	3	0
Total		16	0

== Honours ==
Real Madrid

- La Liga Title : 2013–14

Brighton & Hove Albion

- EFL Championship runner-up: 2016–17

== Personal life ==
Bong has tattoos, mostly on his arm. He has spoken English since 2015.

In September 2018, Bong was fined £667 for driving without a license after being caught speeding. It was later revealed he was previously convicted of two speeding offences two years ago.
