= Paul Devroey =

Belgian medical researcher

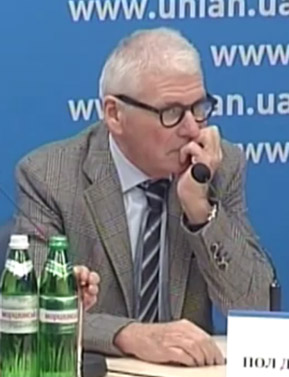
Paul Devroey

Paul Devroey is a Belgian physician, medical researcher and professor emeritus specializing in reproductive medicine and human fertility. He worked at the Vrije Universiteit Brussel (VUB) and UZ Brussel, where he was associated with the Centre for Reproductive Medicine. Devroey is best known for his role in the clinical development of intracytoplasmic sperm injection (ICSI), a form of assisted reproductive technology in which a single sperm cell is injected directly into an oocyte.

== Career ==
Devroey spent much of his career in reproductive medicine at the Vrije Universiteit Brussel and UZ Brussel. Brussels IVF describes Devroey and André Van Steirteghem as two founding figures of its fertility centre, and its assisted reproductive technology training centre is named the Prof. Devroey and Prof. Van Steirteghem Training Centre.

His research profile at the Vrije Universiteit Brussel lists him as emeritus and records research output in fields including intracytoplasmic sperm injection, oocytes, pregnancy rates, in vitro fertilisation and preimplantation genetic diagnosis.

== Intracytoplasmic sperm injection ==
Devroey was one of the researchers involved in the early clinical development of intracytoplasmic sperm injection at the Brussels Centre for Reproductive Medicine. The first report of pregnancies after intracytoplasmic injection of a single spermatozoon into an oocyte was published in The Lancet in 1992 by Gianpiero Palermo, Hubert Joris, Paul Devroey and André Van Steirteghem.

A larger early clinical series was published in Human Reproduction in 1993. The paper reported high fertilisation and implantation rates after ICSI in couples who had failed conventional IVF or who were not accepted for IVF because of insufficient motile spermatozoa.

ICSI later became a widely accepted treatment for couples with severe male-factor infertility.

== Research ==
Devroey's research has focused on infertility treatment, in vitro fertilisation, ICSI, ovarian stimulation, embryo transfer, preimplantation genetic diagnosis and outcomes after assisted reproductive technology. He has also published on strategies intended to reduce complications in IVF treatment, including the prevention of ovarian hyperstimulation syndrome.

== Professional organisations and recognition ==
Devroey was chair of the European Society of Human Reproduction and Embryology (ESHRE) from 2005 to 2007. In 2015, ESHRE listed him among its honorary members.

== Selected publications ==
- Palermo, G.; Joris, H.; Devroey, P.; Van Steirteghem, A. C. "Pregnancies after intracytoplasmic injection of single spermatozoon into an oocyte." The Lancet. 340 (8810): 17–18. 1992. doi:10.1016/0140-6736(92)92425-F.
- Van Steirteghem, A. C.; Nagy, Z.; Joris, H.; Liu, J.; Staessen, C.; Smitz, J.; Wisanto, A.; Devroey, P. "High fertilization and implantation rates after intracytoplasmic sperm injection." Human Reproduction. 8 (7): 1061–1066. 1993. doi:10.1093/oxfordjournals.humrep.a138192.
- Van Steirteghem, A.; Devroey, P.; Liebaers, I. "Intracytoplasmic sperm injection." Molecular and Cellular Endocrinology. 186 (2): 199–203. 2002. doi:10.1016/S0303-7207(01)00658-X.
- Devroey, P.; Polyzos, N. P.; Blockeel, C. "An OHSS-Free Clinic by segmentation of IVF treatment." Human Reproduction. 26 (10): 2593–2597. 2011. doi:10.1093/humrep/der251.

== See also ==
- Assisted reproductive technology
- In vitro fertilisation
- Intracytoplasmic sperm injection
- Preimplantation genetic diagnosis
- André Van Steirteghem
- UZ Brussel
- Vrije Universiteit Brussel
