= Ernestine Gwet Bell =

Cameroonian gynecologist

- Born: 1953 (age 72–73); Sackbayémé, Cameroon
- Citizenship: Cameroon
- Education: University of Paris 5
- Occupation: Gynaecologist
- Notable work: Enabling birth of Cameroon's first IVF baby

Ernestine Gwet-Bell (born 1953) is a Cameroonian gynaecologist who supervised the first successful in vitro fertilisation treatment in her country.

== Early life ==
Gwet-Bell was born in 1953 in Sackbayémé. Her father was initially a Catholic priest, but converted to become a Protestant pastor; her mother was a nurse and midwife. One of six brothers and sisters, she studied medicine at the University of Paris 5. Her first job was at the Council of Baptist and Evangelical Churches Hospital in Bonabéri, which was affiliated to the church she attended; she also worked at the Laquintinie Hospital.

== Career ==
=== Gynaecology ===
In 1987, Gwet-Bell opened a private practice, the Odyssey Clinic, in Douala, which as of 2020 was one of Cameroon's most respected gynaecological medical facilities. Alongside five other colleagues she founded Cameroon's first assisted fertility centre: Centre des Techniques de Pointe en Gynécologie-Obstétrique; her co-founders are: Berthe Bollo, Guy Sandjon, Monique Onomo, Nicole Akoung and Christian Pamy. In 2016, the first public IVF centre opened in Yaounde. Gwet-Bell was its director in 2020. In

In 1998, Gwet-Bell supervised the birth of the first Cameroonian child born through in vitro fertilization. The baby was called Thommy. In 2004, her team were able to successfully practice Intracytoplasmic Sperm Injection (ICSI), an innovative technique designed in 1992 to fight against male sterility in the context of IVF. As of August 2007, she and her team were responsible for the birth of 500 babies through in vitro fertilization. She is President of the Inter-African Fertility Study, Research and Application Group, as well as the union of private doctors in Cameroon.

In 2019 she chaired the organisational committee of a conference which brought together gynaecologists and neonatal specialist from across Cameroon together.

=== Autism ===
One of her nephews has autism and in 2005 her sister Marie Mélanie Bell founded Orchidée Home, which is designed to support autistic children and their parents. Two years later, in 2007, she supported her sister in organising the first autism congress in Cameroon.

== Selected publications ==
- Gwet-Bell, Ernestine; Gwet, Bea B.; Akoung, Nicole; Fiadjoe, Moïse K. (September 2018). "The 5 main challenges faced in infertility care in Cameroon". Global Reproductive Health. 3 (3): e16. doi:10.1097/GRH.0000000000000016. S2CID 201021120.
- Fiadjoe, Moïase Kwasivi; Bell, Ernestine Gwet; Mayenga, Jean-Marc (January 2013). "Prise en charge chirurgicale de l'infertilité : moyens et spécificités en Afrique sub saharienne" [Surgical management: tools and specificity in Sub-Saharan Africa]. Reproduction Humaine et Hormones (in French). 25 (3/4): 59–63. ProQuest 1346653007.
- Bell, Ernestine Gwet (January 2013). "Traitement médical de la femme infertile en Afrique" [The medical treatment of infertile women in Africa]. Reproduction Humaine et Hormones (in French). 25 (3/4): 50–58. ProQuest 1346653005.

== Personal life ==
Gwet Bell is married and has two daughters and a son.
