= Intracytoplasmic morphologically selected sperm injection =

Drawing of the injection step

Intracytoplasmic morphologically selected sperm injection (IMSI) is a laboratory technique used for In vitro fertilisation treatments. High-quality sperms are injected into the egg for fertilization, it is an advanced version of ICSI.

A high powered microscope is used to pick out and the best sperm cells which are then used in a traditional ICSI protocol. In ICSI a magnification of x400 is used, while in IMSI an amplification of x6000 to x10,000 is used, increasing the magnification by a factor of 15. This allows the sperm to be examined in greater detail, including the nucleus which contains the sperm's genetic material. The use of this method has resulted in higher pregnancy and delivery rates and lower abortion rates. IMSI is a method that can be chosen by for anyone who has failed IVF cycles in the past, and for couples who have a component of male infertility.

== History ==
Introduced in 2001, the intracytoplasmic morphologically selected sperm injection (IMSI) procedure changed the perception of how a spermatozoon suitable for fertilization (via injection into the egg) should appear. A very high powered lens is used to see the sperm in greater detail during the selection process. The spermatozoon is selected at higher magnification; the aim of this is to improve the chance of pregnancy. The use of high magnification for morphological sperm selection prior to ICSI has been associated with higher pregnancy rates and lower miscarriage rate.

== Evaluated criteria ==
Spermatozoa can be considered morphologically suitable for ICSI procedures when the sperm head is a regular oval, symmetric and has a smooth appearance. It should be 4.5–4.9 μm in length and 3.1–3.5 μm in width. Nuclear chromatin mass should be homogeneous, with no more than one vacuole, or with a total vacuolar area of less than 4% of nuclear area. Also the central part must be of a normal rectangular shape; between 4.0 and 5.0 μm in length. The acrosome ideally should occupy between 40 and 70% of the head.

== Indications ==
The IMSI may be used in cases with high levels of DNA fragmentation, high levels of sperm aneuploidy, or if there is more than 90% of abnormal forms found in the sperm. It can only be used if the egg quality is deemed normal. It is used in cases where men have severe cases of oligozoospermia, asthenozoospermia or teratozoospermia, and where the couple repeatedly has had early abortions or have a history of miscarriage, or if they have had previous ICSI fertilization failures.

== Reliability ==
In a study, in which thirteen authors from nine different research centers and ART clinics form France, Israel and Spain participated and brought together a set of 9012 in vitro fertilization (IVF) attempts made in cases of male infertility, 3339 (37.1%) using conventional ICSI and 5673 (62.9%) performed using the IMSE technique. In 15.9% of the attempts made using ICSI, no embryo was suitable to be transferred to the uterus of the patients; whereas in the case of the IMSE, this failure occurred only in 7.5% of the attempts.

== Disadvantages ==
Despite its benefits, the IMSI has two drawbacks that makes it difficult to make it into public usage. One of these drawbacks is that the extra duration of the procedure is longer, ranging between 1.5 and 5 hours. This is due to the fact that it is more difficult for the doctor to locate all the sperm with such a significant optical increase. Additionally, due to the high cost of the equipment, IMSI is not available in all IVF laboratories. For these reasons, IMSI is only advisable when the specialist considers that the semen has a very poor quality, as well as in repeated cases of IVF or ICSI failures.

== See also ==
- Reproductive technology
- In vitro fertilisation
- Intracytoplasmic sperm injection
- Assisted reproductive technology
