= Sackbayeme =

Rural city in Cameroon

Coordinates: 4.0333°N 10.5667°E

Sackbayeme is a rural city in Cameroon. It is the birthplace of gynaecologist Ernestine Gwet Bell, who supervised the successful birth of Cameroon's first IVF baby, as well as footballers Gaëtan Bong and Jacques Songo'o.
