= Gianpiero D. Palermo =

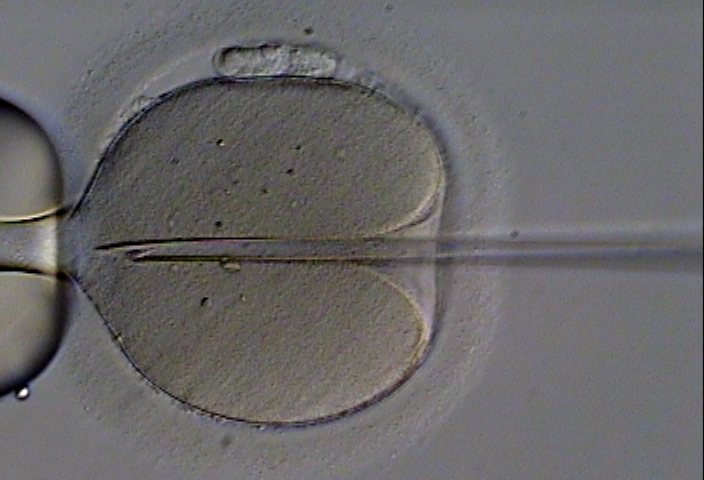
Intracytoplasmic sperm injection of a human oocyte

Gianpiero D. Palermo is the developer of the revolutionary procedure known as intracytoplasmic sperm injection (ICSI) in 1991, which is able to overcome male infertility in many cases.

Since 1993, he has been the Director of Assisted Fertilization and Andrology at The Center for Reproductive Medicine and Infertility and has led the ICSI Program there. He is also Professor of reproductive medicine at Weill Cornell Medical College of Cornell University. He leads a team of researchers involved in molecular and genetic aspects of fertilization and male infertility, follow-up of ICSI babies, the development of new procedures to treat age-related female infertility, and harvesting and differentiation of embryonic stem cells.

== Honors and awards ==
- 2009 Shared Jacob Heskel Gabbay Award for Biotechnology and Medicine with Alan H. Handyside and Ann A. Kiessling
