= Bonabéri =

Bonabery
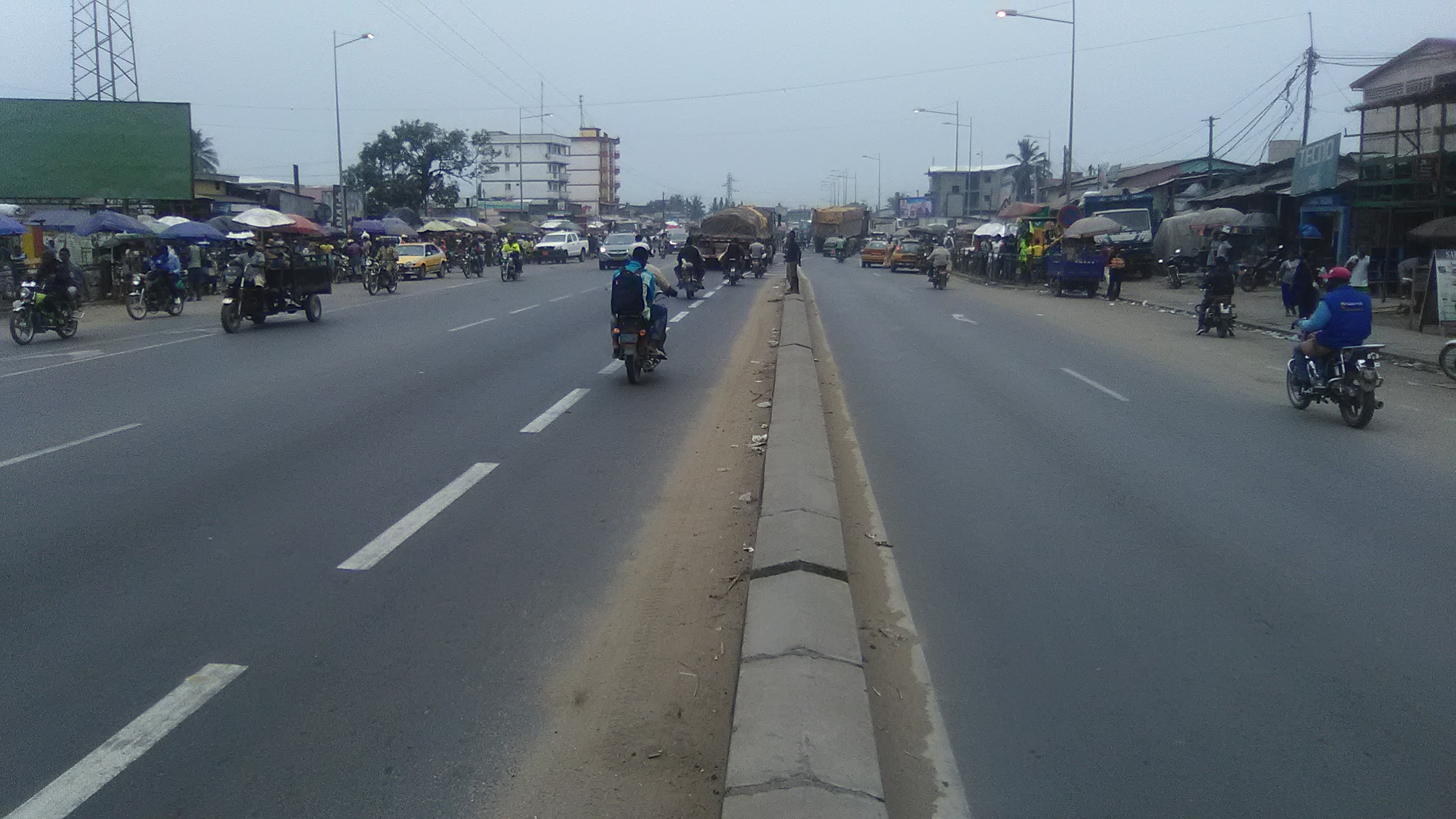
- Bonabery road

- Location in Cameroon
- Coordinates: 4°4′30″N 9°40′12″E
- Country: Cameroon
- Province: Littoral Region

Bonabery is a district of Douala, the largest city and economic capital of Cameroon. It is located on the right bank of the Wouri River, opposite the districts of Akwa, Deido and Bonanjo. Bonabery is home to many industries, markets, and transport facilities. It is also a cultural hub, with a vibrant music scene and a rich history. It is located on the western side of the harbour across the Wouri River from the larger port of Douala.

== Districts ==
Bonaberi has 10 districts:

- Bojongo
- Bonamatoumbe
- Bonamikano
- Bonassama
- Bonendale I
- Bonendale II
- Djebale I
- Djebale II
- Mambanda
- Nkomba

== Administration ==
The municipality has been headed by a mayor since 1987.

Douala IV Mayors
Période	Identité	Parti	Notes
2020 - 2025	Edouard Hervé Moby Mpah	RDPC	Doctor of medicine and teacher
2013 - 2020	Frédéric Amond Koum Elangue	RDPC	Businessman
2007 - 2013	John Ndangle Kumase	SDF
2002 - 2007	Gabriel Fandja	RDPC
1996 - 2002	Isaac Kwemo	SDF	Businessman
1987 - 1996	El Hadj Tanko Amadou	RDPC	traditional chief, businessman

== Transport ==
It is served by a station on the national railway system.

== Views of Bonaberi ==
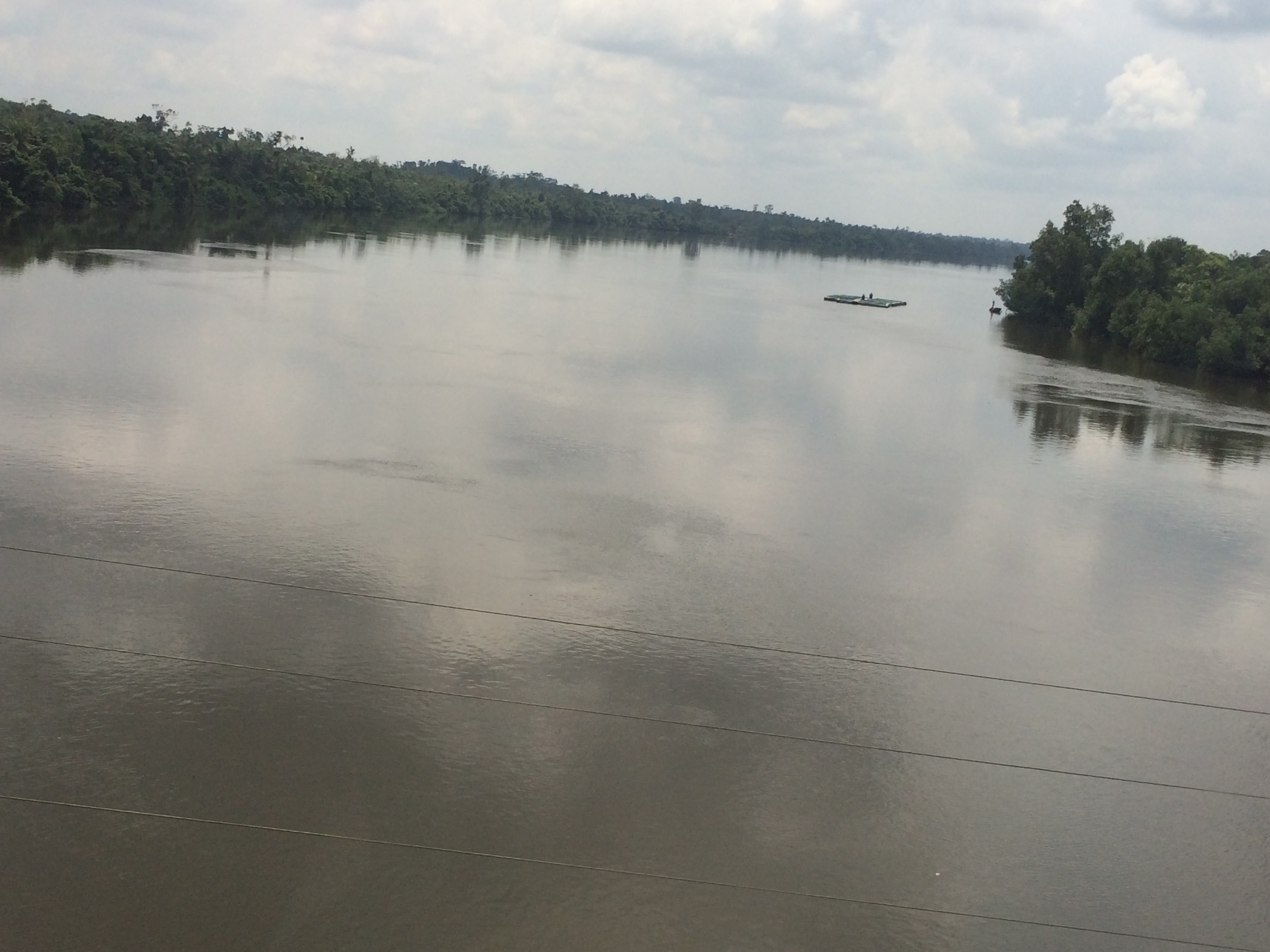
Bonaberi from Wouri

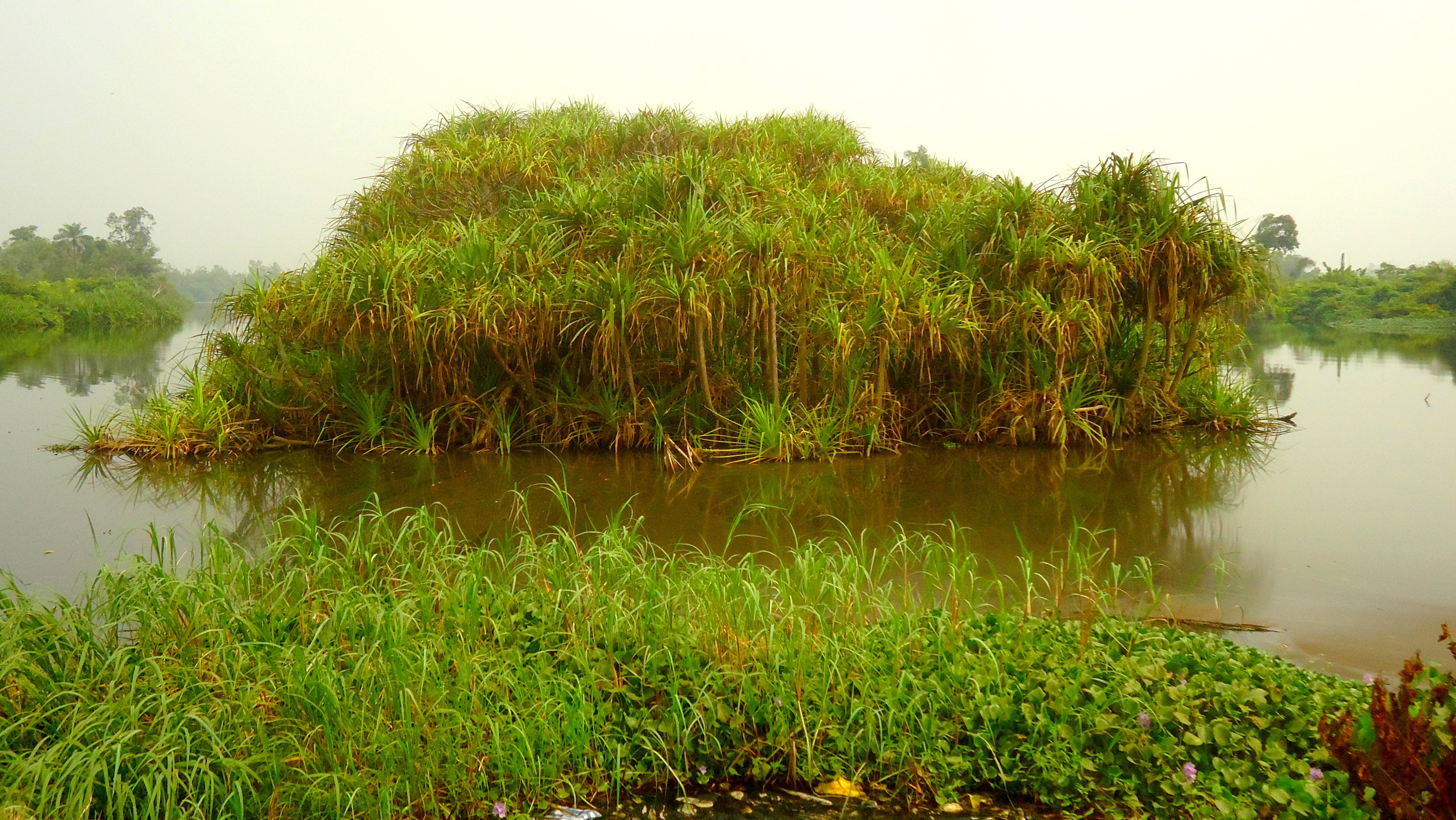
Bonaberi mangrove swamp

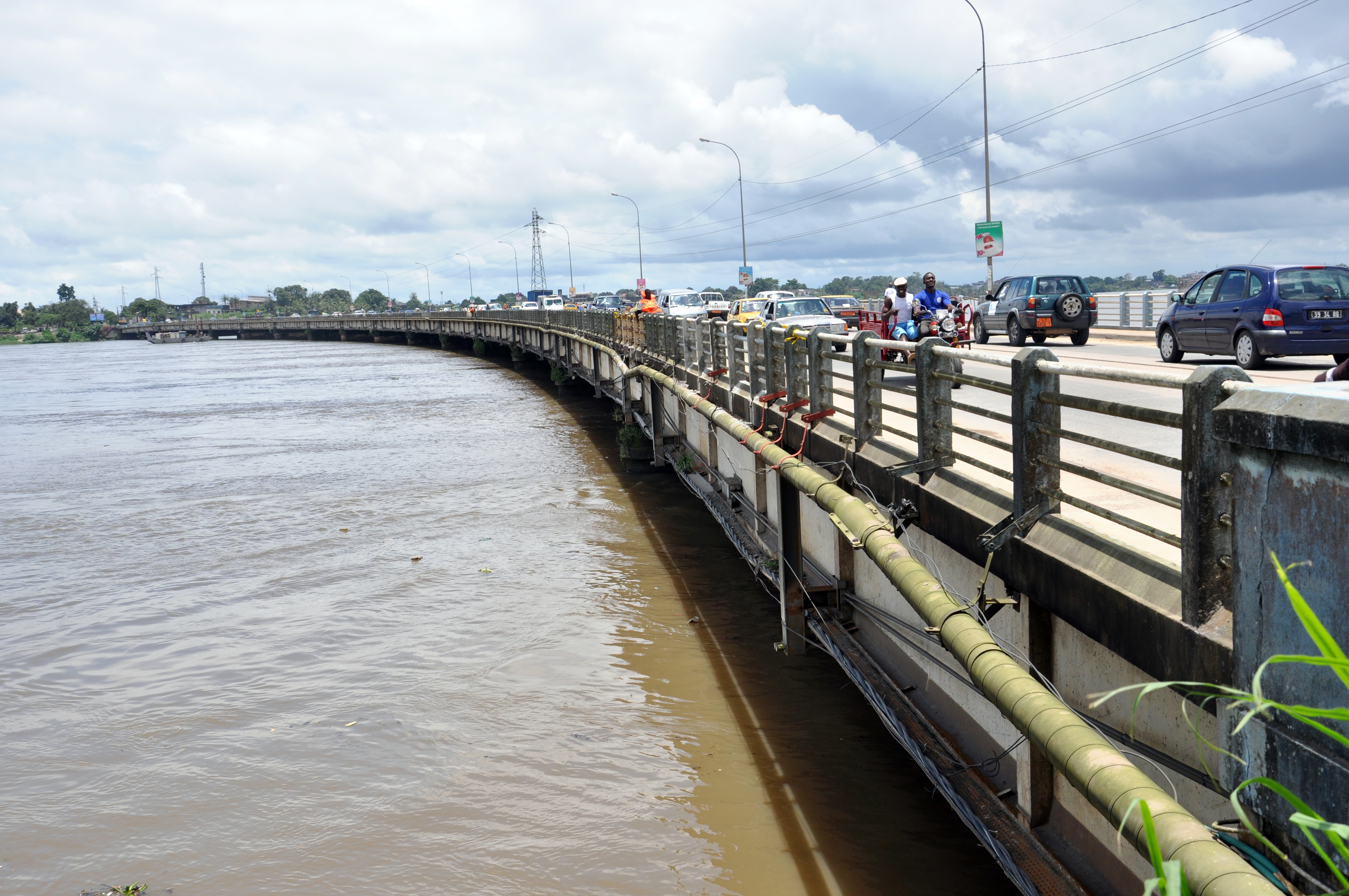
Bonaberi Entrance from Wouri

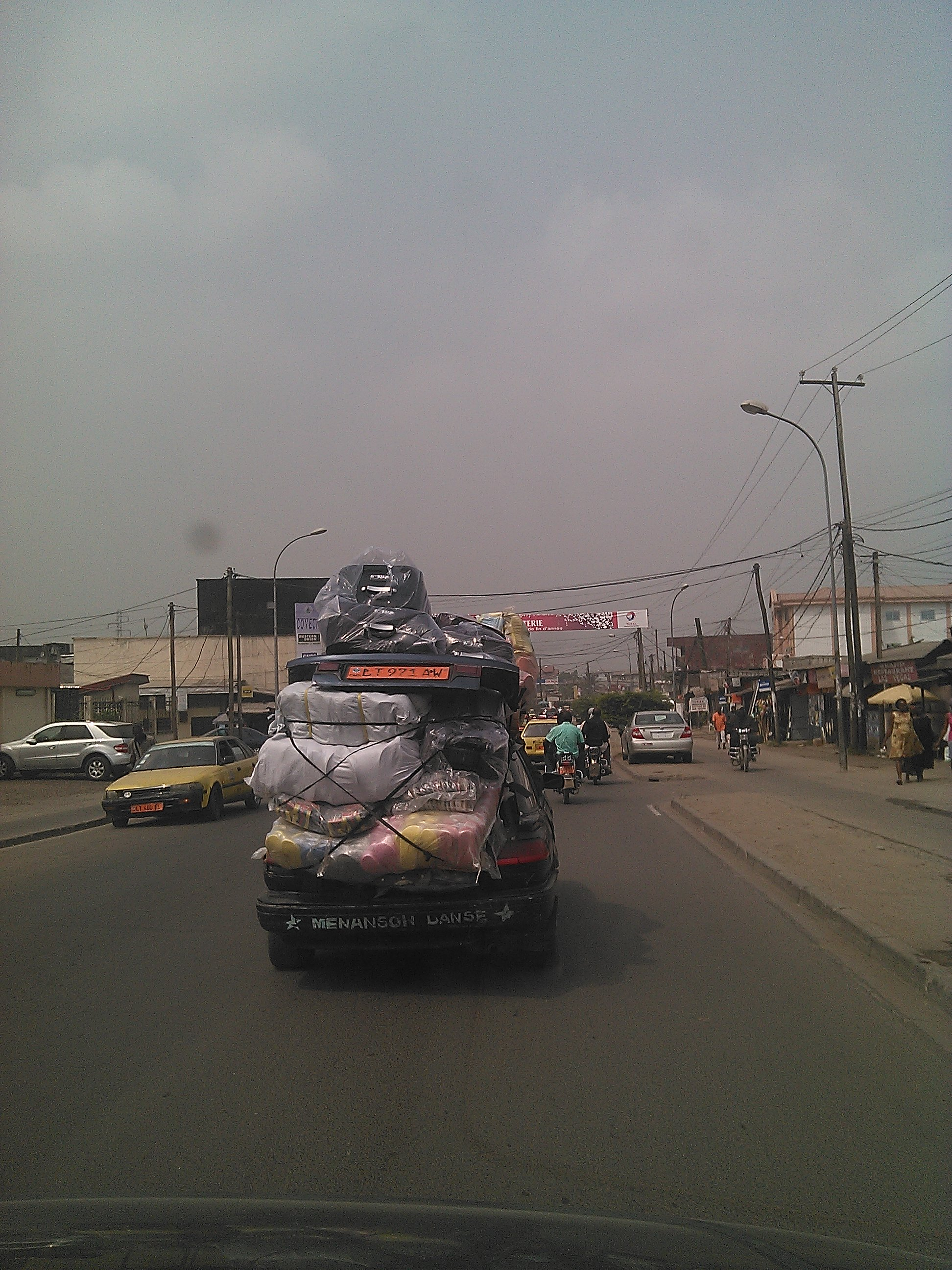
Taxi-brousse at Bonabéri
(2016-2017)

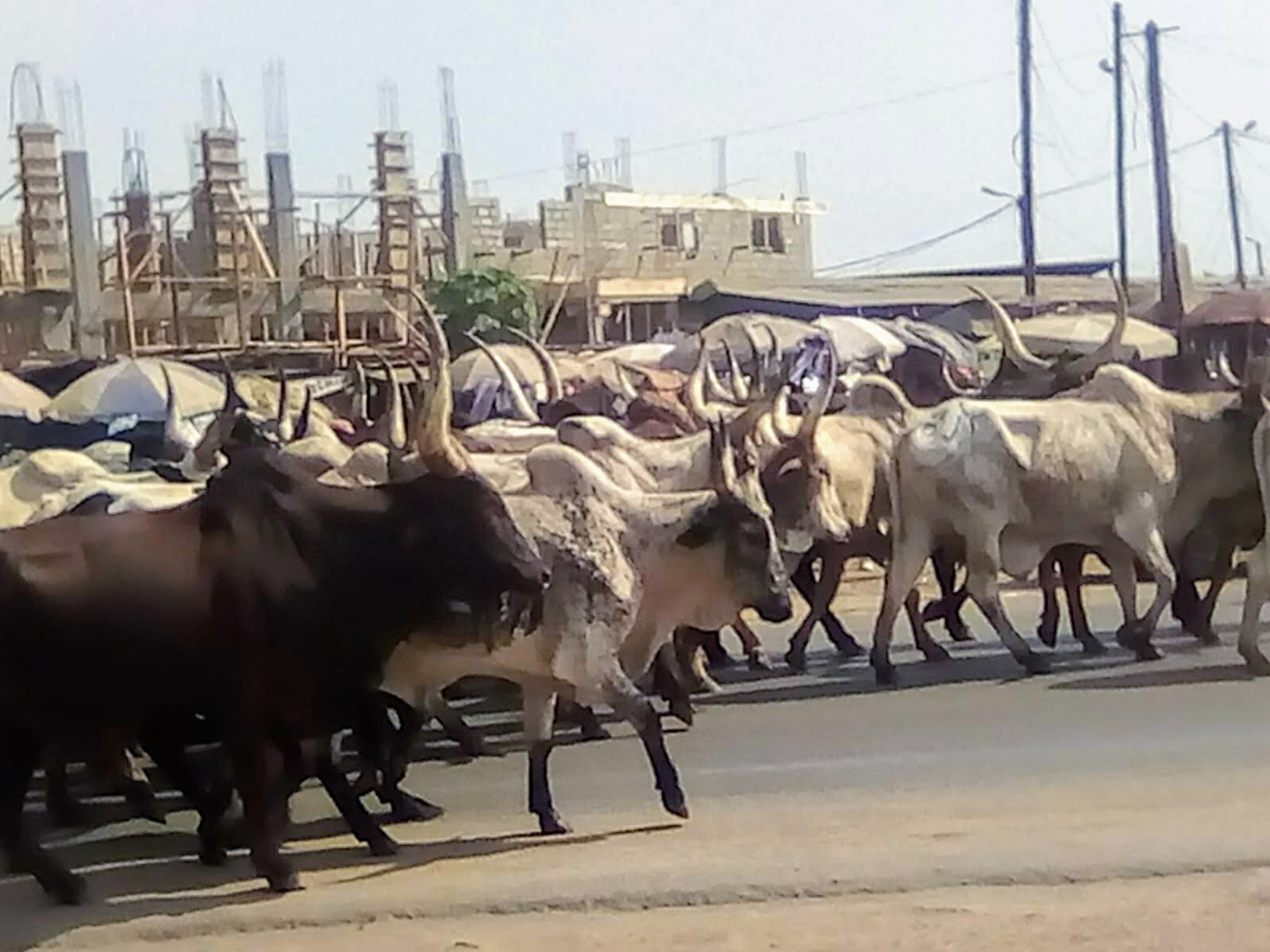
Herd of oxen on the road(2019).

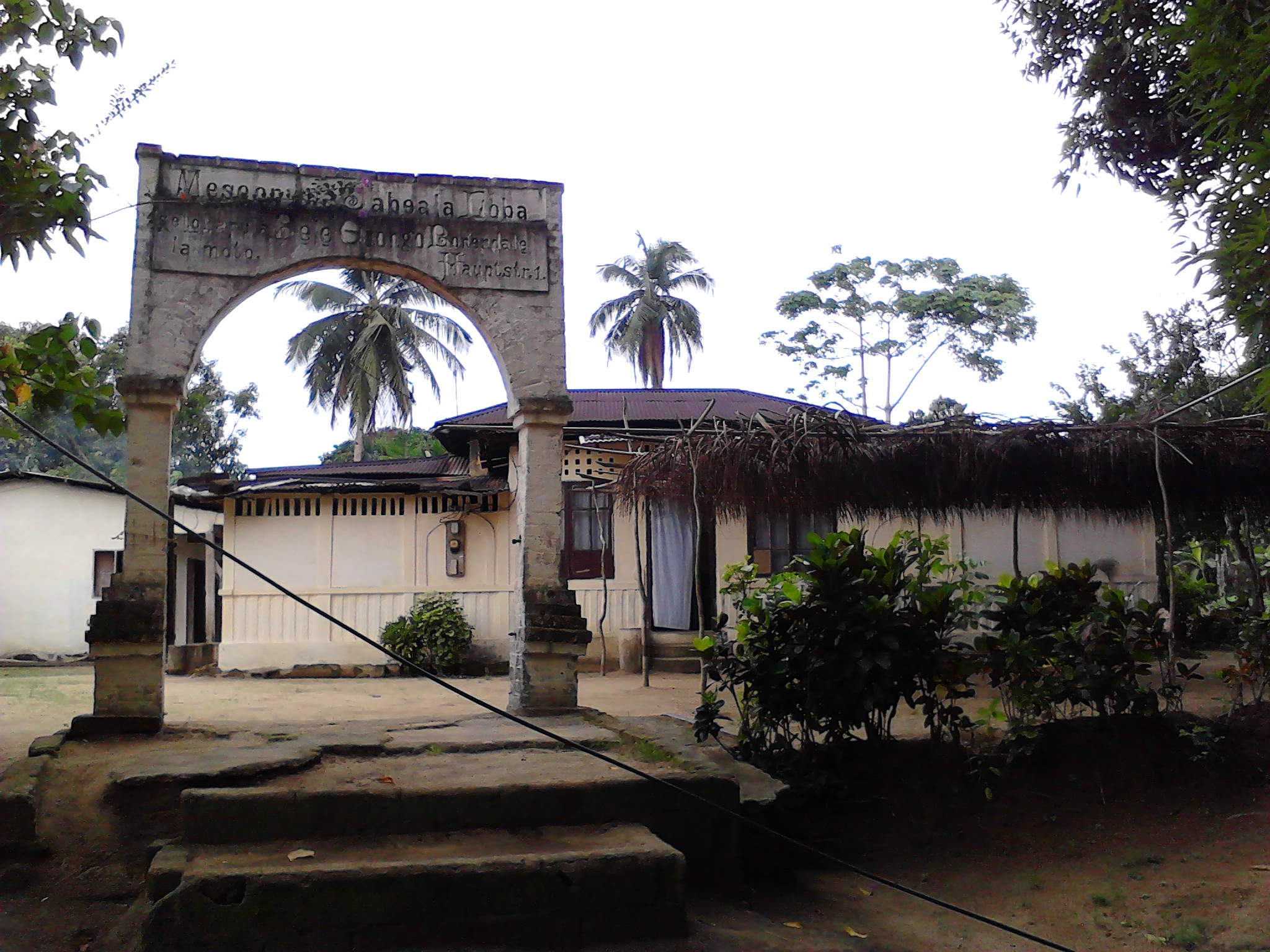
Chefferie at Bonendale (2013)

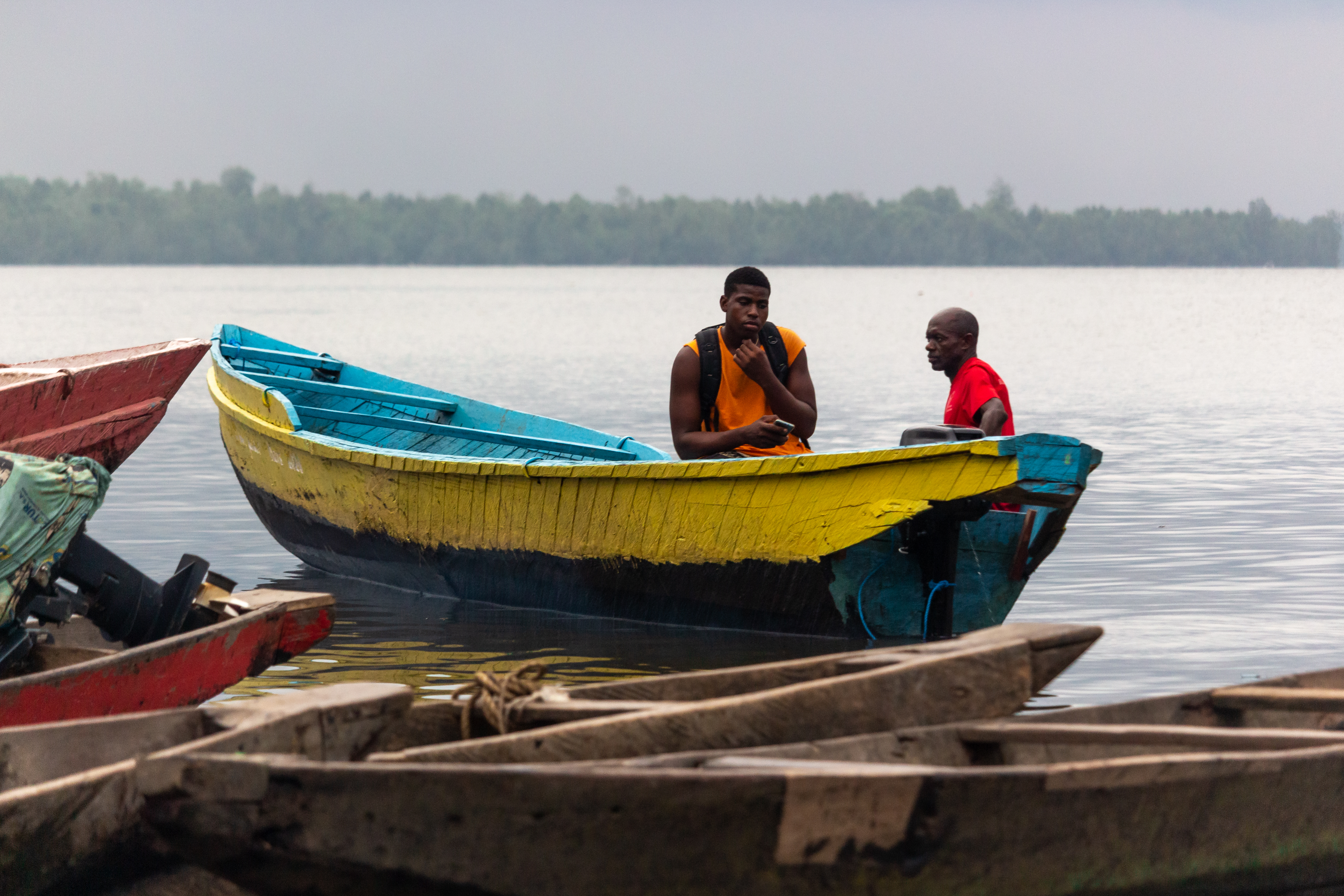
Boats on Wouri (2020)

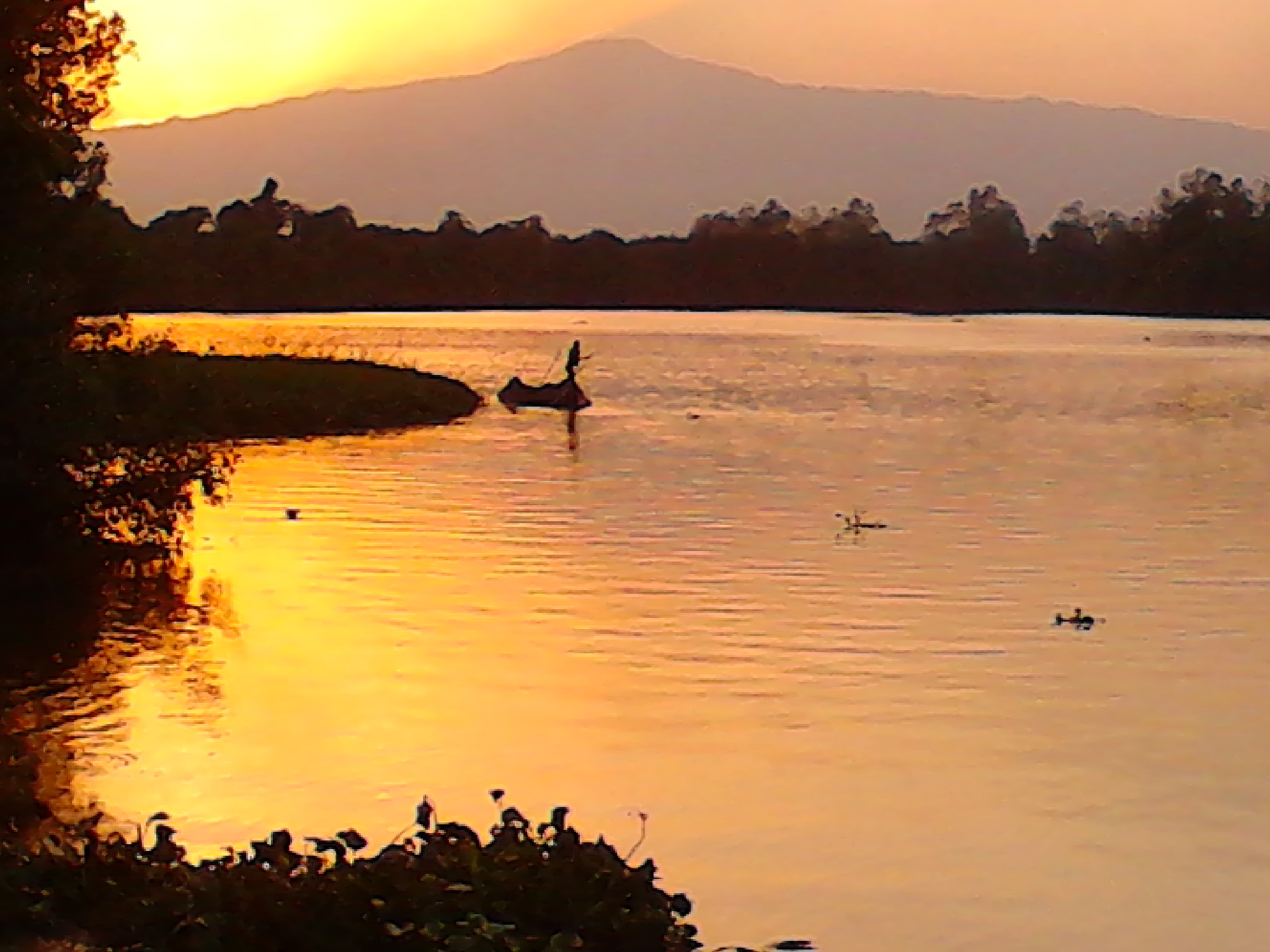
Couché du soleil at Bonendale (2013)

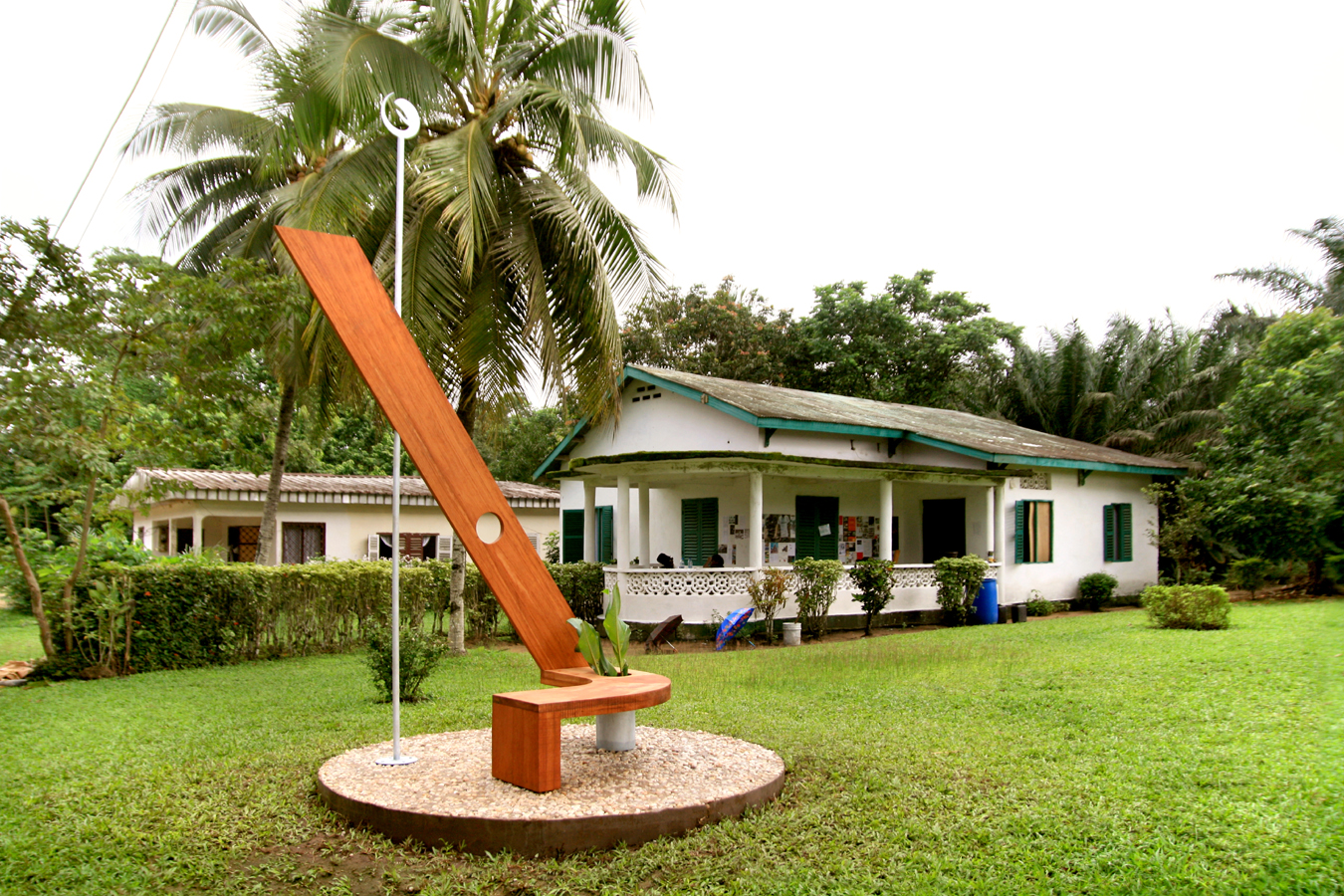
Bonendale, artist residency (2012)

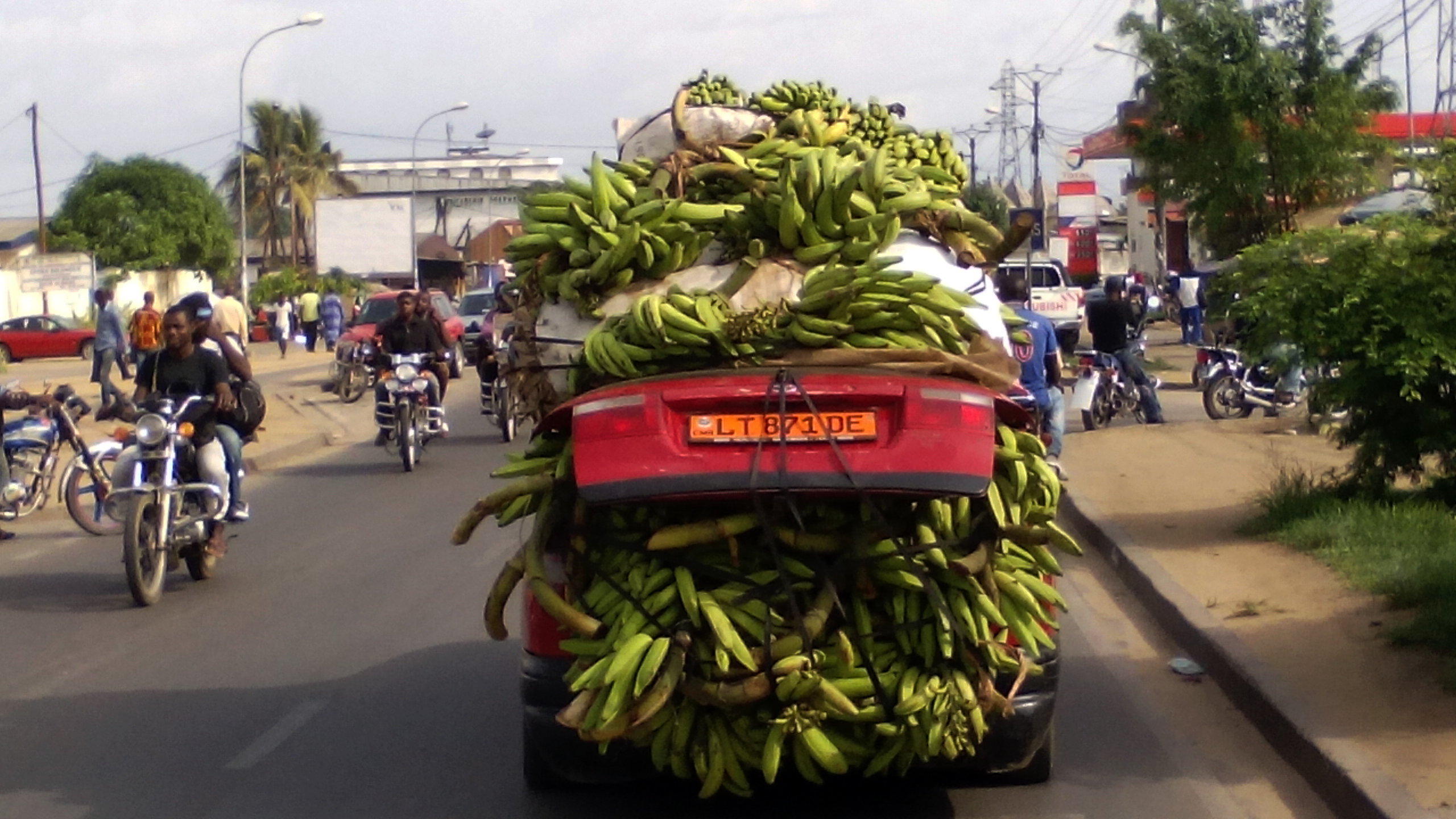
Bonaberi Streets (2015).

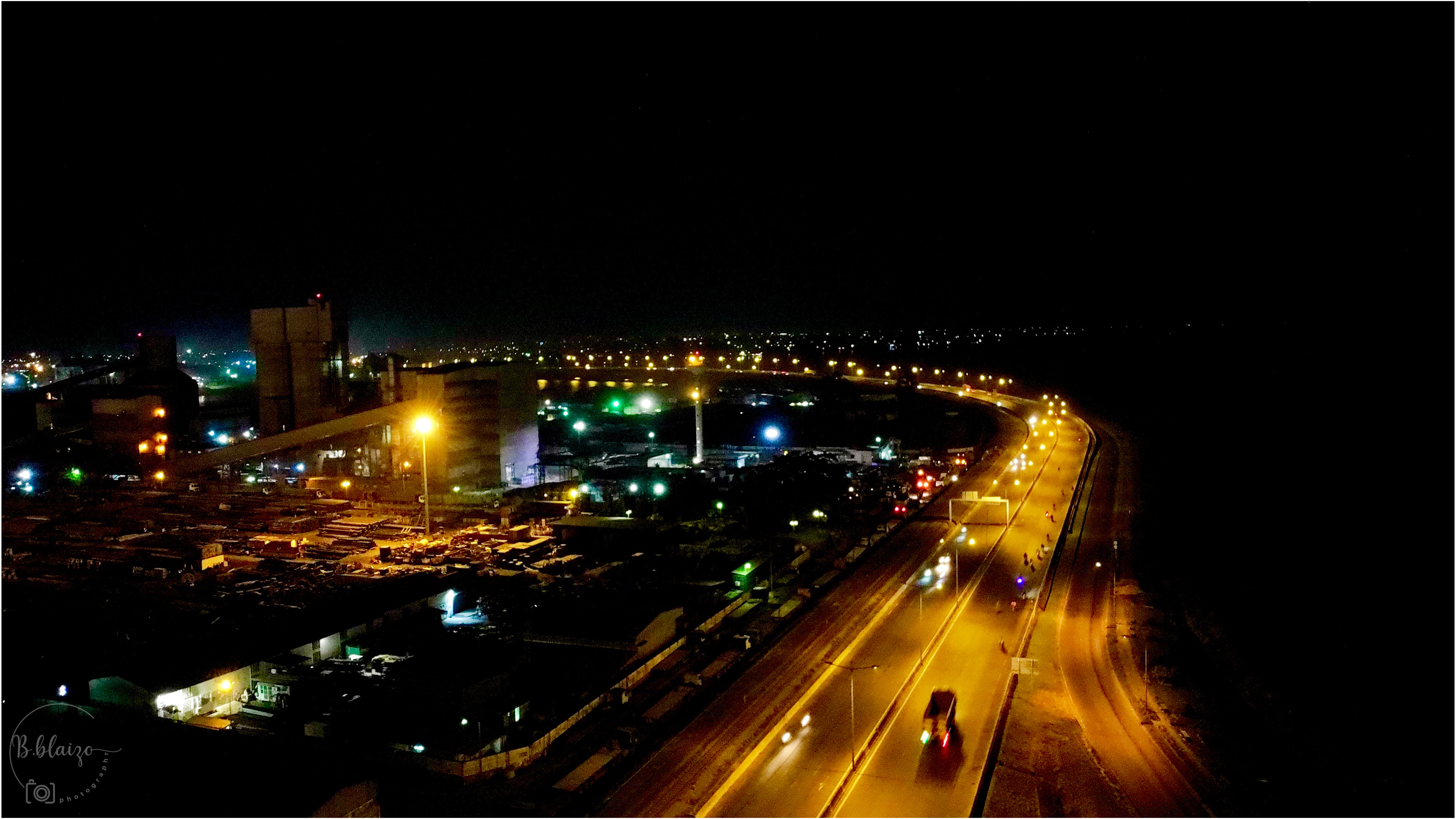
Beautiful night shot of the Bonaberi bridge

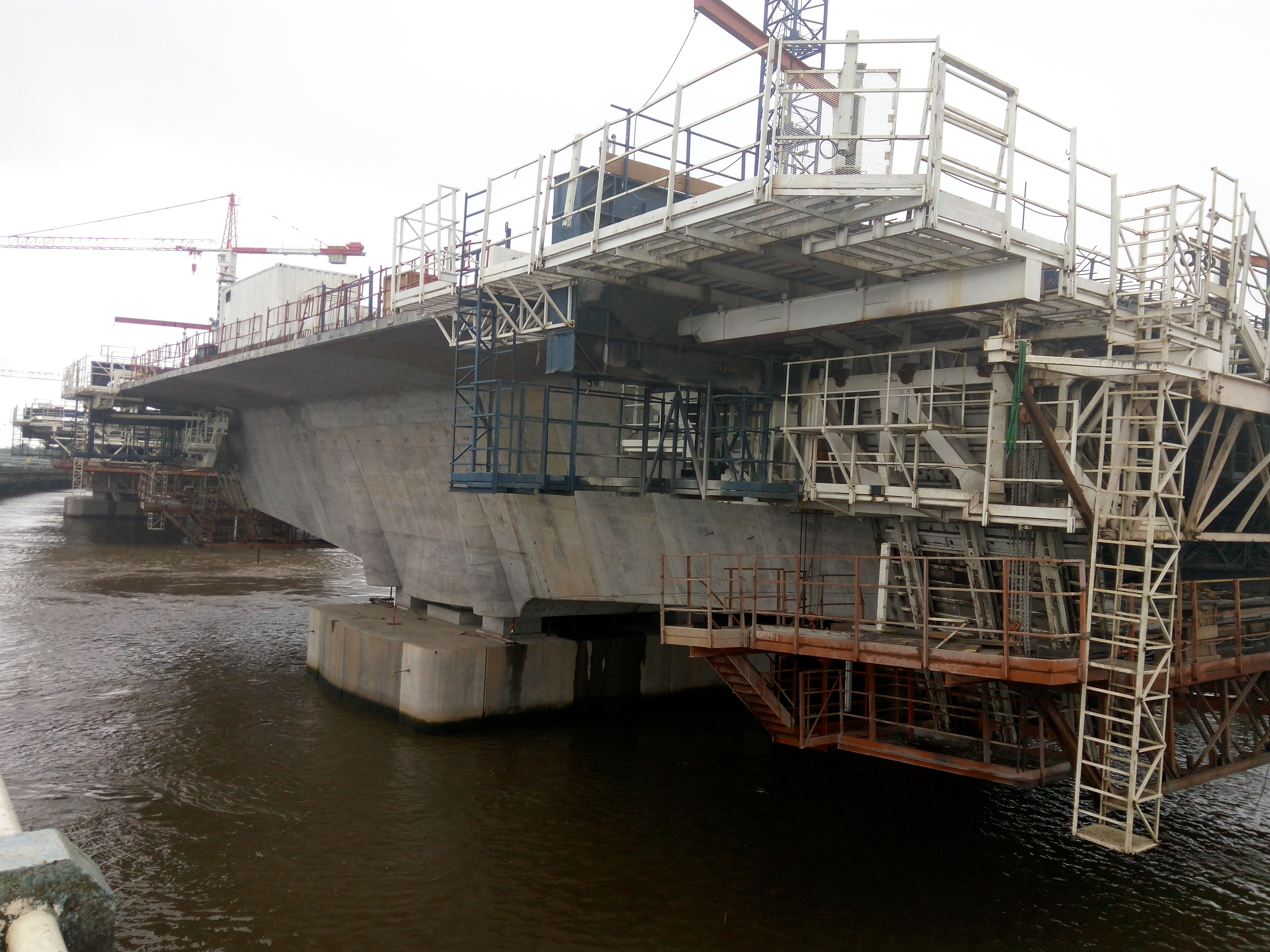
Le deuxième pont en construction sur le fleuve Wouri pour relier Bonaberi à Douala.

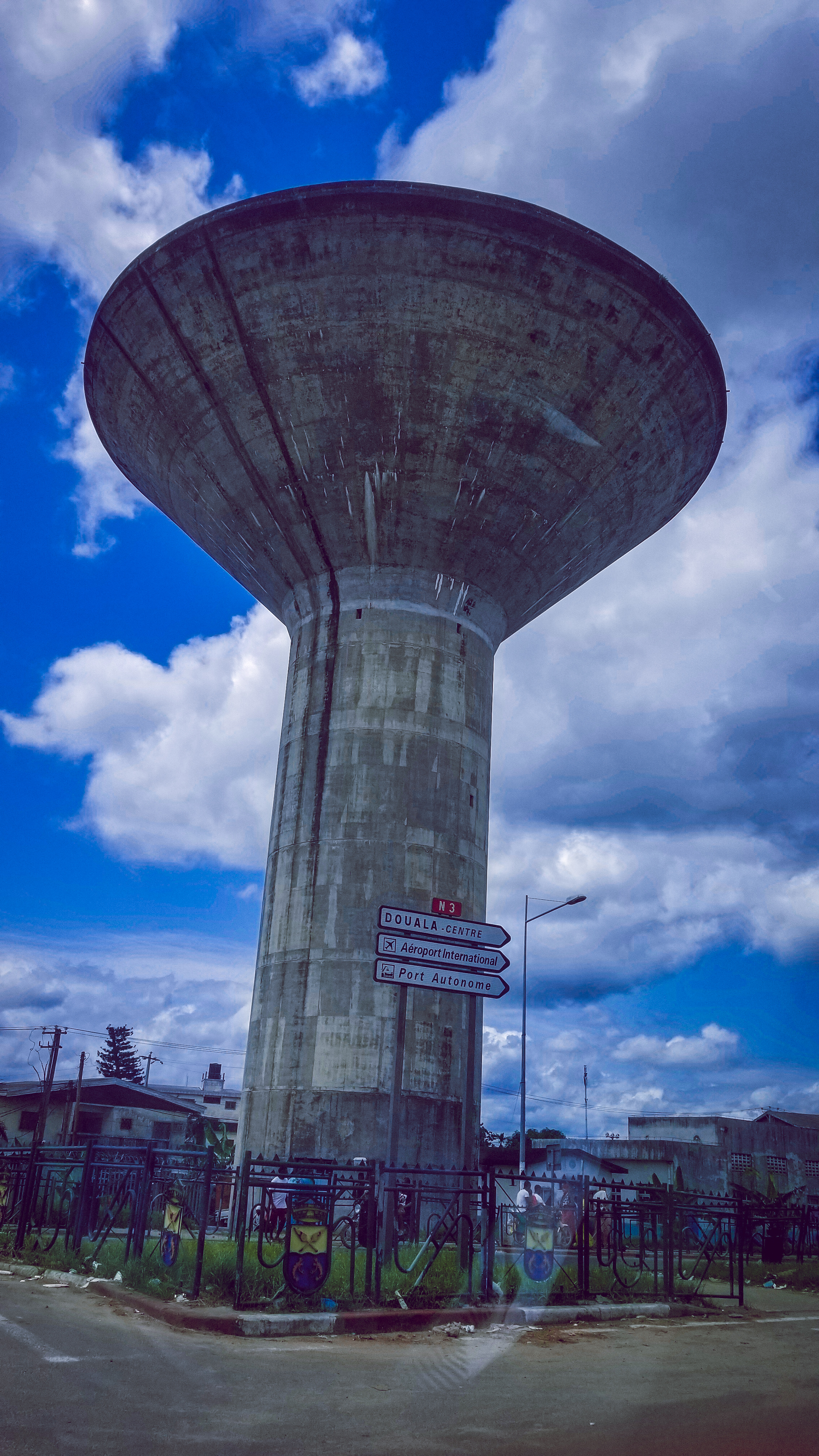
Water Tank at Bonaberi Doaula

== Notable people ==
- Ernestine Gwet Bell - gynaecologist who supervised the birth of Cameroon's first IVF baby, worked at Council of Baptist and Evangelical Churches Hospital.
- It was founded in 1884 by King Akwa of Douala, who ceded the land to the German colonialists in exchange for protection and trade privileges.

== See also ==
- Douala
- Railway stations in Cameroon
- Communes of Cameroon
