= Intracytoplasmic sperm injection =

In vitro fertilization procedure

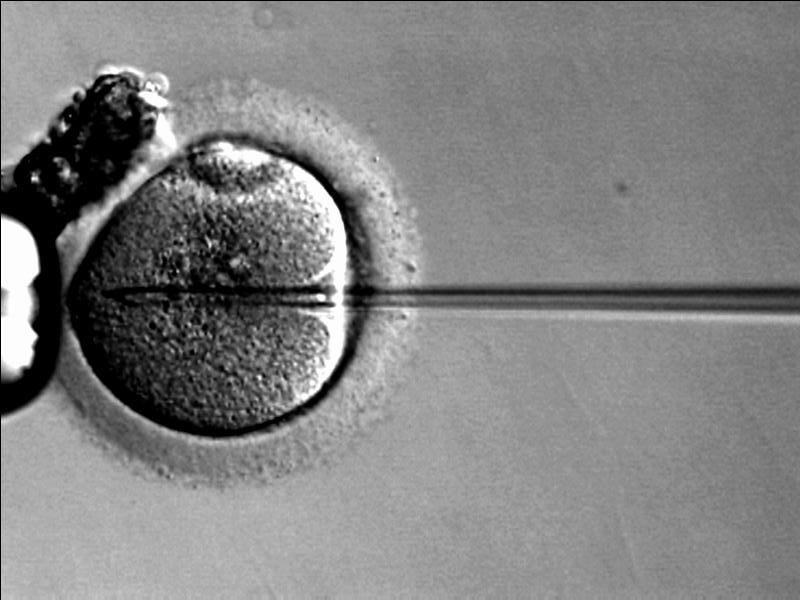
- Oocyte cytoplasm is injected with the sperm during ICSI
- MeSH: D020554

Intracytoplasmic sperm injection (ICSI /ˈɪksi/ IK-see) is an in vitro fertilization (IVF) procedure in which a single sperm cell is injected directly into the cytoplasm of an egg. This technique is used in order to prepare the gametes for the obtention of embryos that may be transferred to a maternal uterus. With this method, the acrosome reaction is skipped.

There are several differences between classic IVF and ICSI. However, the steps to be followed before and after insemination are the same. In terms of insemination, ICSI needs only one sperm cell per oocyte, while IVF needs 50,000–100,000. This is because the acrosome reaction has to take place and thousands of sperm cells have to be involved in IVF. Once fertilized, the egg is transformed into a pre-embryo and it has to be transferred to the uterus to continue its development.

The first human pregnancy generated by ICSI was carried out in 1991 by Gianpiero Palermo and his team.

== Round spermatid injection (ROSI) ==
Round spermatid injection (ROSI) is a technique of assisted reproduction whereby a round spermatid is injected into oocyte cytoplasm in order to achieve fertilization. This technique can be used to enable genetic fatherhood to some men who have no spermatozoa in the ejaculate (azoospermia) and in whom spermatozoa cannot be obtained surgically from the testicles. This condition is called non-obstructive or secretory azoospermia, as opposed to obstructive azoospermia, in which complete sperm production does occur in the testicles, and potentially fertilizing spermatozoa can be obtained by testicular sperm extraction (TESE) and used for ICSI. In cases of nonobstructive (secretory) azoospermia, on the other hand, testicular sperm production is blocked at different stages of the process of sperm formation (spermatogenesis). In those men in whom spermatogenesis is blocked at the stage of round spermatids, in which meiosis has already been completed, these round cells can successfully fertilize oocytes after being injected into their cytoplasm.

Even though many technical aspects of ROSI are similar to those of ICSI, there are also significant differences between both techniques. In the first place, as compared to spermatozoa, round spermatids do not possess easily perceptible morphological characteristics and are immotile. Consequently, the distinction between round spermatids and other round cells of similar size, such as leukocytes, is not an easy task. Moreover, the distinction between living round spermatids, to be used in ROSI, and dead round spermatids, to be discarded, needs specific methods and skills, not required in the case of ICSI where sperm cell viability can be easily evaluated on the basis of sperm motility in most cases. The microinjection procedure for ROSI also differs slightly from that of ICSI, since additional stimuli are needed to ensure proper oocyte activation after spermatid injection. If all requirements for round spermatid selection and injection are successfully met, the injected oocytes develop to early embryos and can be transferred to the mother's uterus to produce pregnancy.

The first successful pregnancies and births with the use of ROSI were achieved in 1995 by Jan Tesarik and his team. The clinical potential of ROSI in the treatment of male infertility due to the total absence of spermatozoa has been corroborated recently by a publication reporting on the postnatal development of 90 babies born in Japan and 17 in Spain. Based on the evaluation of the babies born, no abnormalities attributable to the ROSI technique have been identified.

== Indications ==
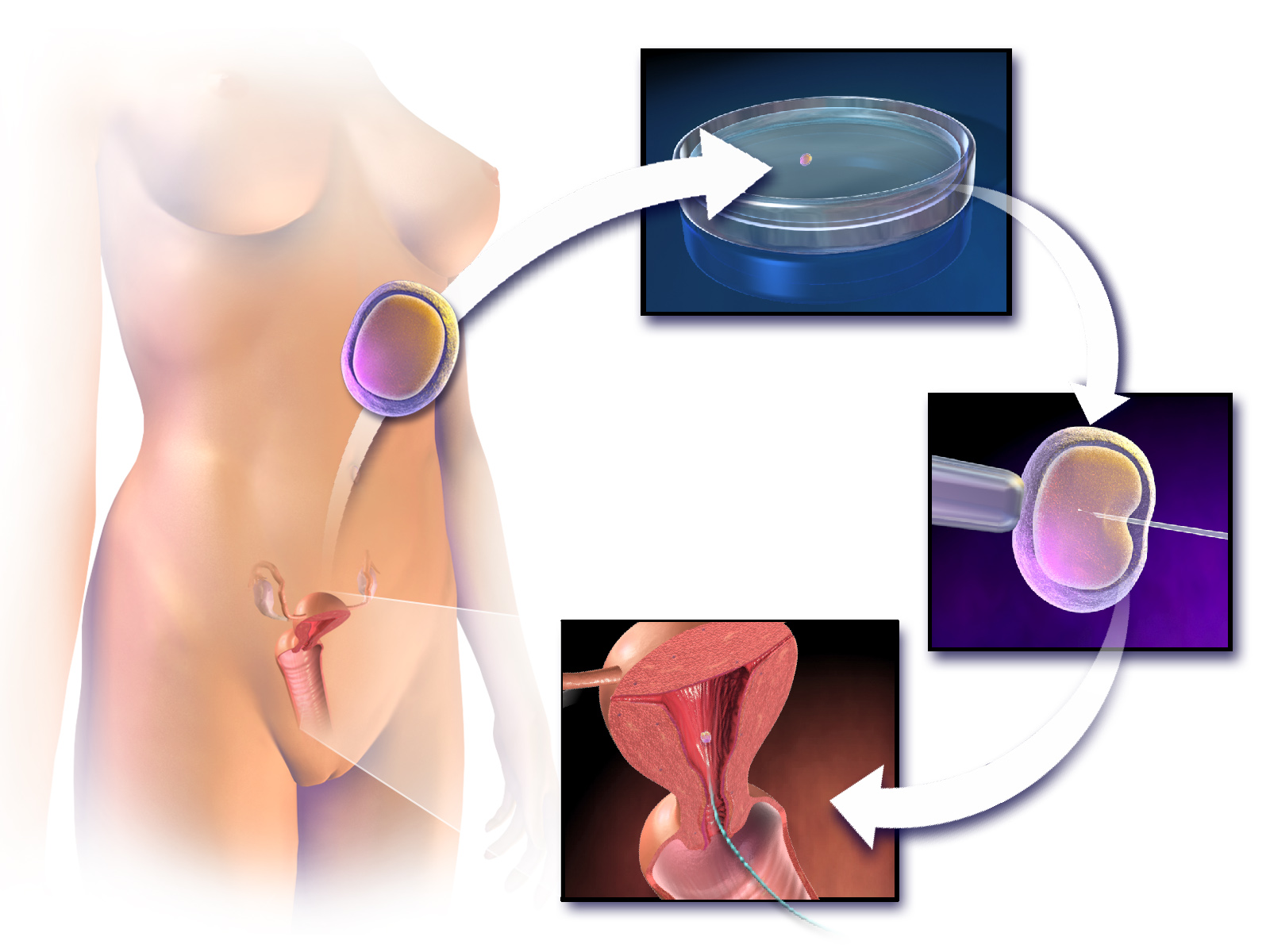
Schematic image of intracytoplasmic sperm injection in the context of IVF.

This procedure is most commonly used to overcome male infertility problems, although it may also be used where eggs cannot easily be penetrated by sperm, and occasionally in addition to sperm donation.

It can be used in teratozoospermia, because once the egg is fertilized, abnormal sperm morphology does not appear to influence blastocyst development or blastocyst morphology. Even with severe teratozoospermia, microscopy can still detect the few sperm cells that have a "normal" morphology, allowing for optimal success rate.

Additionally, specialists use ICSI in cases of azoospermia (when there are no spermatozoa ejaculated but they can be found in testis), when valious spermatozoa (the name given to sperm samples taken to preservate fertility after chemotherapy) is available, or after previous irruptions in IVF cycles.

== Sperm selection ==
Before performing ICSI, sperm in vitro selection and capacitation has to be done. Apart from the most common techniques of in vitro sperm capacitation (swim-up, density gradients, filtration and simple wash), some new techniques are useful and have advantages over older methods.

One of these new techniques is the use of microfluidic chips, like Zymot ICSI chip invented by Prof. Utkan Demirci. This chip is a device that helps identify the highest quality spermatozoa for the ICSI technique. It reproduces the conditions of the vagina, resulting in a more natural spermatozoa selection. One of the main advantages of this method is spermatozoa quality, as the selected ones have better motility, morphology, little DNA fragmentation and less quantity of reactive oxygen species (ROS).

Another way to perform the selection is the MACS technique, which consists of tiny magnetic particles linked to an antibody (annexin V) which is able to identify more viable spermatozoa. When the semen sample is passed through a column with a magnetic field, apoptotic respermatozoa are retained in the column while the healthy ones are easily obtained at the bottom of it.

PICSI is another method derived from this one, the only difference is the selection process of the spermatozoa. In this case, they are placed on a plate containing drops of a synthetic compound similar to hyaluronic acid. We will know which spermatozoa are mature because they will bind to the HA drops. This is because only mature sperm have a receptor for hyaluronic acid, which they need because this acid can be found surrounding the oocytes, and sperm need to be able to bind to this acid and digest it in order to fertilize the oocyte. After the mature spermatozoa have been selected, they can be used for the microinjection of oocytes. Sperms selected by hyaluronic acid has about no effect on whether a live birth results, but may reduce miscarriage.

== History ==
The first child born from a gamete micromanipulation (technique in which special tools and inverted microscopes are used that help embryologists to choose and pick an individual sperm for ICSI IVF) was a Singapore-born child in April 1989.

The technique was developed by Gianpiero Palermo at the Vrije Universiteit Brussel, in the Center for Reproductive Medicine headed by Paul Devroey and Andre Van Steirteghem. Actually, the discovery was made by a mistake.

The procedure itself was first performed in 1987, though it only went to the pronuclear stage. The first activated embryo by ICSI was produced in 1990, but the first successful birth by ICSI took place on January 14, 1992, after an April 1991 conception.

Sharpe et al comment on the success of ICSI since 1992 saying, "[t]hus, the woman carries the treatment burden for male infertility, a fairly unique scenario in medical practice. ICSI's success has effectively diverted attention from identifying what causes male infertility and focused research onto the female, to optimize the provision of eggs and a receptive endometrium, on which ICSI's success depends."

== Procedure ==
ICSI is generally performed following a transvaginal oocyte retrieval procedure to extract one or several oocytes from a woman.

In ICSI IVF, the male partner or a donor provides a sperm sample on the same day when the eggs are collected. The sample is checked in the lab, and if no sperm is present, doctors will extract sperm from the epididymis or testicle. The extraction of sperm from epididymis is also known as percutaneous epididymal sperm aspiration (PESA) and extraction of sperm from testicle is also known as testicular sperm aspiration (TESA). Depending on the total amount of spermatozoa in the semen sample, either low or high, it can be just washed or capacitated via swim-up or gradients, respectively.

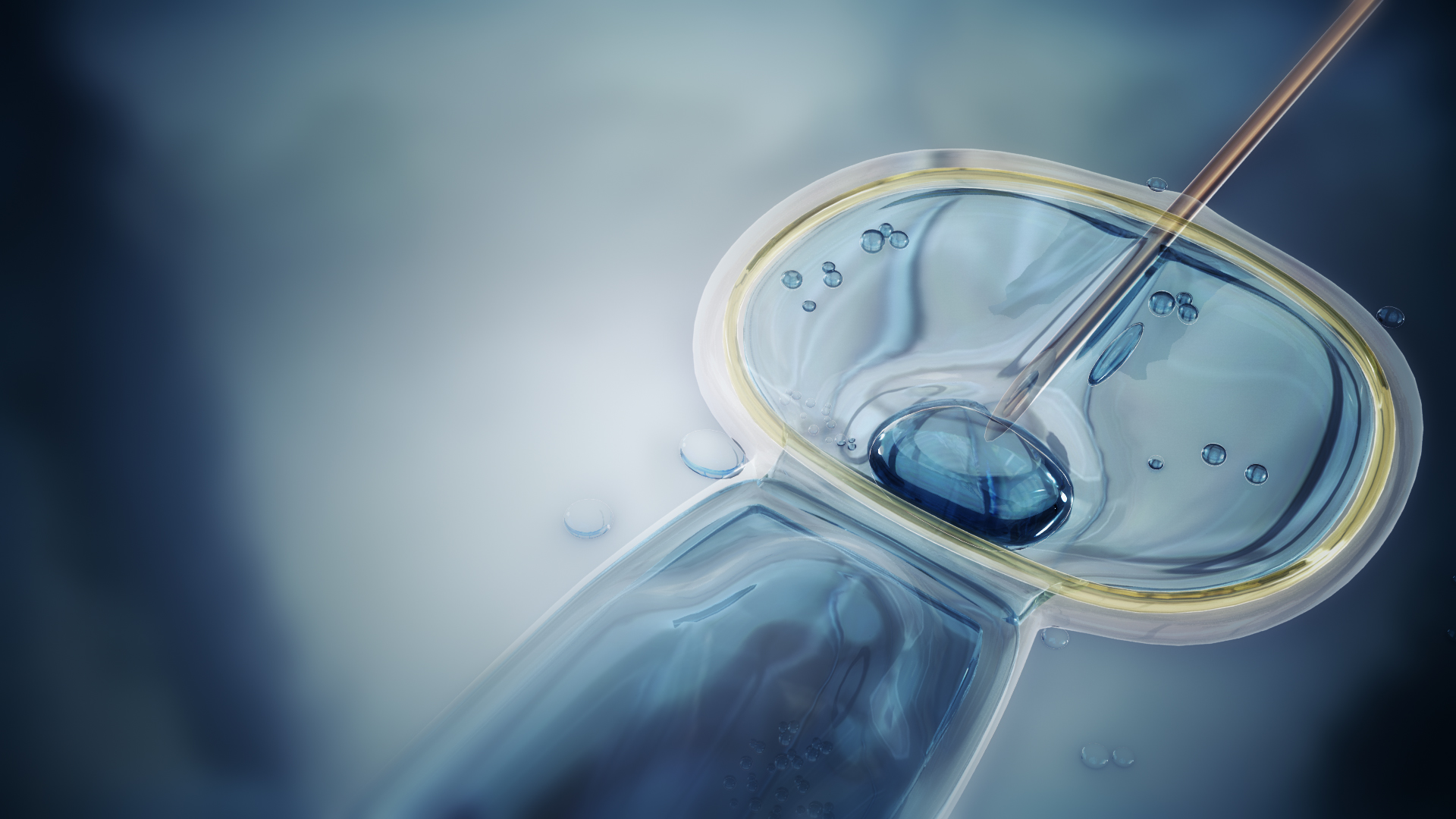
A medical animation still showing the ICSI procedure.

The procedure is done under a microscope using multiple micromanipulation devices (micromanipulator, microinjectors and micropipettes). A holding pipette stabilizes the mature oocyte with gentle suction applied by a microinjector. From the opposite side a thin, hollow glass micropipette is used to collect a single sperm, having immobilised it by cutting its tail with the point of the micropipette. The oocyte is pierced through the oolemma and the sperm is directed into the inner part of the oocyte (cytoplasm). The sperm is then released into the oocyte. The pictured oocyte has an extruded polar body at about 12 o'clock indicating its maturity. The polar body is positioned at the 12 or 6 o'clock position, to ensure that the inserted micropipette does not disrupt the spindle inside the egg. After the procedure, the oocyte will be placed into cell culture and checked on the following day for signs of fertilization.

In contrast, in natural fertilization sperm compete and when the first sperm penetrates the oolemma, the oolemma hardens to block the entry of any other sperm. Concern has been raised that in ICSI this sperm selection process is bypassed and the sperm is selected by the embryologist without any specific testing. However, in mid-2006 the FDA cleared a device that allows embryologists to select mature sperm for ICSI based on sperm binding to hyaluronan, the main constituent of the gel layer (cumulus oophorus) surrounding the oocyte. The device provides microscopic droplets of hyaluronan hydrogel attached to the culture dish. The embryologist places the prepared sperm on the microdot, selects and captures sperm that bind to the dot. Basic research on the maturation of sperm shows that hyaluronan-binding sperm are more mature and show fewer DNA strand breaks and significantly lower levels of aneuploidy than the sperm population from which they were selected. A brand name for one such sperm selection device is PICSI. A recent clinical trial showed a sharp reduction in miscarriage with embryos derived from PICSI sperm selection.

'Washed' or 'unwashed' sperm may be used in the process.

Live birth rate are significantly higher with progesterone to assist implantation in ICSI cycles. Also, addition of a GNRH agonist has been estimated to increase success rates.

Ultra-high magnification sperm injection (IMSI) has no evidence of increased live birth or miscarriage rates compared to standard ICSI.

A new variation of the standard ICSI-procedure called Piezo-ICSI uses small axial mechanical pulses (Piezo-pulses) to lower stress to the cytoskeleton during zona pellucida and oolemma breakage. The procedure includes specialized Piezo actuators, microcapillaries, and filling medium to transfer mechanical pulses to the cell membranes. The Piezo technique itself was for example established for animal ICSI and animal ES cell transfer.

== Assisted zona hatching (AH) ==
People who have experienced repeatedly failed implantation, or whose experimental embryo has a thick zona pellucida (covering) around the embryo, have ideal candidates for assisted zona hatching. The procedure involves creating a hole in the zona to improve the chances of normal implantation of the embryo in the uterus.

=== Preimplantation genetic diagnosis (PGD) ===
PGD is a process in which one or two cells from an embryo on Day 3 or Day 5 are extracted and the cells genetically analyzed. Couples who are at a high risk of having abnormal number of chromosomes or who have a history of single gene defects or chromosome defects are ideal candidates for this procedure. It is used to diagnose a large number of genetic defects at present.

== Success or failure factors ==
One of the areas in which sperm injection can be useful is vasectomy reversal. However, potential factors that may influence pregnancy rates (and live birth rates) in ICSI include level of DNA fragmentation as measured e.g. by comet assay, advanced maternal age and semen quality. It is uncertain whether ICSI improves live birth rates or reduces the risk of miscarriage compared with ultra‐high magnification (IMSI) sperm selection.

A systematic meta-analysis of 24 estimates of DNA damage based on a variety of techniques concluded that sperm DNA damage negatively affects clinical pregnancy following ICSI.

Numerous biochemical markers were shown to be associated with oocyte quality for ICSI. For example, it was shown that after ICSI the follicular fluid of unfertilized oocytes contains high levels of cytotoxicity and oxidative stress markers, as Cu,Zn-superoxide dismutase, catalase, and lipoperoxidation product 4-hydroxynonenal (4-HNE) -protein conjugates.

== Complications ==
There is some suggestion that birth defects are increased with the use of IVF in general, and ICSI specifically, though different studies show contradictory results. In a summary position paper, the Practice Committee of the American Society of Reproductive Medicine has said it considers ICSI safe and effective therapy for male factor infertility, but may carry an increased risk for the transmission of selected genetic abnormalities to offspring, either through the procedure itself or through the increased inherent risk of such abnormalities in parents undergoing the procedure.

There is not enough evidence to say that ICSI procedures are safe in females with hepatitis B in regard to vertical transmission to the offspring, since the puncture of the oocyte can potentially avail for vertical transmission to the offspring.

== Follow-up on fetus ==
In addition to regular prenatal care, prenatal aneuploidy screening based on maternal age, nuchal translucency scan and biomarkers is appropriate. However, biomarkers seem to be altered for pregnancies resulting from ICSI, causing a higher false-positive rate. Correction factors have been developed and should be used when screening for Down syndrome in singleton pregnancies after ICSI, but in twin pregnancies such correction factors have not been fully elucidated. In vanishing twin pregnancies with a second gestational sac with a dead fetus, first trimester screening should be based solely on the maternal age and the nuchal translucency scan as biomarkers are significantly altered in these cases.

== See also ==
- Reproductive technology
- Ernestine Gwet Bell
