= List of Baptist World Alliance National Fellowships =

This list of Baptist World Alliance National Fellowships includes member associations of the Baptist World Alliance.

== Statistics ==
According to an Alliance census released in 2025, the BWA has 283 participating Baptist fellowships in 138 countries, with 178,000 churches and 53,000,000 baptized members. The Alliance is divided into six regional or geographical fellowships: North American Baptist Fellowship, Caribbean Baptist Fellowship, Latin American Baptist Union, European Baptist Federation, Asia Pacific Baptist Federation, and All-Africa Baptist Fellowship.

== North American Baptist Fellowship ==
- Canada : Canadian Baptist Ministries
- Canada : Canadian National Baptist Convention
- Canada/United States : North American Baptist Conference
- Canada/United States : Czechoslovak Baptist Convention of USA & Canada
- Canada/United States : Seventh Day Baptist General Conference USA & Canada
- United States : American Baptist Churches USA
- United States : Baptist General Association of Virginia
- United States : Baptist General Convention of Missouri
- United States : Baptist General Convention of Texas
- United States : Chin Baptist Churches USA
- United States : Converge
- United States : Cooperative Baptist Fellowship
- United States : District of Columbia Baptist Convention
- United States : General Association of General Baptists
- United States : Kachin Baptist Churches USA
- United States : Hispanic Baptist Convention of Texas
- United States : Lott Carey Baptist Foreign Mission Convention
- United States : National Baptist Convention of America International, Inc.
- United States : National Missionary Baptist Convention of America
- United States : Progressive National Baptist Convention
- United States : Russian-Ukrainian Evangelical Baptist Union, USA, Inc.
- United States : Union of Latvian Baptists in America
- United States : Zomi Baptist Churches of America

== Caribbean Baptist Fellowship ==
- Antigua and Barbuda : Antigua Baptist Association
- Bahamas : Bahamas National Baptist Missionary and Educational Convention
- Barbados : Barbados Baptist Convention
- Barbados : Baptist Alliance of Barbados
- Belize : Baptist Association of Belize
- Bermuda : Bermuda Baptist Fellowship
- Cuba : Baptist Convention of Eastern Cuba
- Cuba : Baptist Convention of Western Cuba
- Cuba : Fellowship of Baptist Churches in Cuba
- Cuba : Free Will Baptist Convention of Cuba
- Dominican Republic : Dominican Baptist Convention
- Grenada : Grenada Baptist Association
- Guadeloupe : Baptist Evangelical Churches Federation of Guadeloupe
- Guyana : Baptist Convention of Guyana
- Haiti : Baptist Convention of Haiti
- Haiti : Evangelical Baptist Mission of South Haiti
- Haiti : Association of Conservative Baptist Churches of Haiti
- Haiti : Connection of Haitian Baptist Churches for Integral Mission
- Jamaica : Jamaica Baptist Union
- Saint Kitts and Nevis : St. Kitts Baptist Association
- Saint Vincent and the Grenadines : St. Vincent Baptist Convention
- Trinidad and Tobago : Baptist Union of Trinidad and Tobago
- Turks and Caicos Islands : Turks and Caicos Islands Baptist Union Inc.

== Latin American Baptist Union ==
- Argentina : Evangelical Baptist Convention of Argentina
- Argentina : Argentine Baptist Association
- Bolivia : Bolivian Baptist Union
- Bolivia : Baptist Convention of Bolivia
- Brazil : Brazilian Baptist Convention
- Brazil : National Baptist Convention, Brazil
- Brazil : Convention of Independent Baptist Churches
- Chile : Union of Evangelical Baptist Churches of Chile
- Chile : National Baptist Convention of Chile
- Colombia : Colombian Baptist Denomination
- Costa Rica : Federation of Baptist Associations of Costa Rica
- Ecuador : Ecuadorian Baptist Convention
- El Salvador : Baptist Association of El Salvador
- El Salvador : Baptist Federation of El Salvador
- Guatemala : Convention of Baptist Churches in Guatemala
- Honduras : National Convention of Baptist Churches in Honduras
- Mexico : National Baptist Convention of Mexico
- Nicaragua : Baptist Convention of Nicaragua
- Panama : Baptist Convention of Panama
- Paraguay : Baptist Evangelical Convention of Paraguay
- Peru : Baptist Evangelical Convention of Peru
- Uruguay : Baptist Evangelical Convention of Uruguay
- Venezuela : National Baptist Convention of Venezuela

== European Baptist Federation ==
- Armenia : Union of Evangelical Christian Baptist Churches of Armenia
- Austria : Baptist Union of Austria
- Azerbaijan : Union of Evangelical Christian Baptists of Azerbaijan
- Belarus : Union of Evangelical Christian Baptists of Belarus
- Belgium : Union of Baptists in Belgium
- Bosnia and Herzegovina : Baptist Church in Bosnia and Herzegovina
- Bulgaria : Baptist Union of Bulgaria
- Croatia : Baptist Union of Croatia
- Czech Republic : Baptist Union in the Czech Republic
- Denmark : Baptist Union of Denmark
- Egypt : Egyptian Baptist Convention
- Estonia : Union of Free Evangelical & Baptist Churches of Estonia
- Finland : Finnish Baptist Church
- Finland : Swedish Baptist Union of Finland
- France : Federation of Evangelical Baptist Churches of France
- Georgia : Evangelical Baptist Church of Georgia
- Germany : Union of Evangelical Free Church Congregations in Germany
- Hungary : Baptist Union of Hungary
- Israel : Association of Baptist Churches in Israel
- Italy : Baptist Evangelical Christian Union of Italy
- Jordan : Jordan Baptist Convention
- Latvia : Union of Baptist Churches in Latvia
- Lebanon : Lebanese Baptist Evangelical Convention
- Lithuania : Baptist Union of Lithuania
- Moldova : Union of Christian Evangelical Baptist Churches of Moldova
- Netherlands : Union of Baptist Churches in the Netherlands
- Norway : Baptist Union of Norway
- North Macedonia : Union of the Baptist Christians in the Republic of North Macedonia
- Palestine : Council of Local Evangelical Churches in the Holy Land
- Poland : Baptist Christian Church of the Republic of Poland
- Portugal : Portuguese Baptist Convention
- Romania : Union of Christian Baptist Churches in Romania
- Romania : Convention of Hungarian Baptists of Romania
- Russia : Euro-Asiatic Federation of Unions of Evangelical Christians-Baptists
- Russia : Union of Evangelical Christians-Baptists of Russia
- Serbia : Union of Baptist Churches in Serbia
- Serbia : Union of Christian Baptist Churches in Serbia
- Slovakia : Baptist Union of Slovakia
- Slovenia : Union of Baptist Churches in Slovenia
- Spain : Baptist Evangelical Union of Spain
- Sweden : Evangelical Free Church in Sweden
- Switzerland : Swiss Baptist Union
- Syria : Baptist Convention of Syria
- Turkey : Turkish Baptist Alliance
- Uzbekistan : Union of Evangelical Christian-Baptists of Uzbekistan
- Ukraine : All-Ukrainian Union of Churches of Evangelical Christian Baptists
- United Kingdom : Baptist Union of Great Britain
- United Kingdom : Baptist Union of Scotland
- United Kingdom : Baptist Union of Wales

== Asia Pacific Baptist Federation ==
- Australia : Baptist Union of Australia
- Bangladesh : Bangladesh Baptist Church Fellowship
- Bangladesh : Bangladesh Baptist Church Sangha
- Bangladesh : Bangladesh Free Baptist Churches
- Cambodia : Cambodia Baptist Union
- Fiji : Fiji Baptist Convention
- Hong Kong : Baptist Convention of Hong Kong
- India : Council of Baptist Churches in Northeast India
  - Arunachal Baptist Church Council
  - Assam Baptist Convention
  - Garo Baptist Convention
  - Karbi-Anglong Baptist Convention
  - Manipur Baptist Convention
  - Nagaland Baptist Church Council
- India : Association of Telugu Baptist Churches
- India : Council of Baptist Churches in Eastern India
- India : Baptist Church of Mizoram
- India : Baptist Union of North India
- India : Bengal Baptist Union
- India : Convention of Baptist Churches of the Northern Circars
- India : Evangelical Baptist Convention of India
- India : Garo Baptist Convention
- India : Gospel Association of India
- India : India Association of General Baptists
- India : India Baptist Convention
- India : Karnataka Baptist Convention
- India : Lairam Jesus Christ Baptist Church
- India : Lower Assam Baptist Union
- India : Maharashtra Baptist Society
- India : North Bank Baptist Christian Association
- India : Orissa Baptist Evangelical Crusade
- India : Telangana Baptist Convention
- India : Tripura Baptist Christian Union
- India : Baptist Union of Tamil Nadu
- Indonesia : Convention of Indonesian Baptist Churches
- Indonesia : Union of Indonesian Baptist Churches
- Japan : Japan Baptist Convention
- Japan : Japan Baptist Conference
- Japan : Japan Baptist Union
- Japan : Okinawa Baptist Convention
- Korea : Korea Baptist Convention
- Macau : Macau Baptist Convention
- Malaysia : Malaysia Baptist Convention
- Myanmar : Myanmar Baptist Convention
- Myanmar : Zomi Baptist Convention of Myanmar
- Myanmar : Self Supporting Kayin Baptist Mission Society
- Mongolia : Mongolian Baptist Convention
- Nepal : Nepal Baptist Church Council
- Papua New Guinea : Baptist Union of Papua New Guinea
- New Zealand : Baptist Union of New Zealand
- Philippines : Baptist Conference of the Philippines
- Philippines : Convention of Philippine Baptist Churches
- Philippines : Convention of Visayas and Mindanao of Southern Baptist Churches
- Philippines : General Baptist Churches of the Philippines
- Philippines : Luzon Convention of Southern Baptist Churches
- Samoa : Baptist Union of Samoa
- Singapore : Singapore Baptist Convention
- Sri Lanka : Sri Lanka Baptist Union
- Thailand : Thailand Karen Baptist Convention
- Thailand : 12th District of Church of Christ in Thailand
- Thailand : Thailand Baptist Convention
- Thailand : Thailand Lahu Baptist Convention
- Thailand : Kawthoolei Karen Baptist Church
- Taiwan : Chinese Baptist Convention
- Vanuatu : Vanuatu Baptist Churches
- Vietnam : Baptist Convention of Vietnam

== All-Africa Baptist Fellowship ==
- Angola : Baptist Convention of Angola
- Angola : Baptist Evangelical Church in Angola
- Angola : Free Baptist Church in Angola
- Angola : Baptist Evangelical Union in Angola
- Benin : Union of Baptist Churches of Benin
- Botswana : Baptist Convention of Botswana
- Burkina Faso : Union of Evangelical Baptist Churches of Burkina Faso
- Burundi : Union of Baptist Churches in Burundi
- Burundi : Free Baptist Churches of Burundi
- Cameroon : Native Baptist Church of Cameroon
- Cameroon : Cameroon Baptist Convention
- Cameroon : Union of Baptist Churches of Cameroon
- Cape Verde : Evangelical Baptist Church Association of Cape Verde
- Central African Republic : Evangelical Baptist Church of the Central African Republic
- Central African Republic : Association of Baptist Churches of Central African Republic
- Central African Republic : Baptist Churches Union of the Central African Republic
- Central African Republic : Baptist Evangelical Community in Central Africa
- Central African Republic : Baptist Fellowship Church
- Central African Republic : Communion of Evangelical Baptist Churches in Central Africa
- Central African Republic : National Association Baptist Churches
- Central African Republic : Fraternal Union of Baptist Churches of the Central African Republic
- Chad : Baptist Evangelical Church of Chad
- Congo : Federation of Baptist Churches in Congo
- Democratic Republic of the Congo : Baptist Community of Congo
- Democratic Republic of the Congo : Baptist Community of the Congo River
- Democratic Republic of the Congo : Baptist Community of the Faithful in Africa
- Democratic Republic of the Congo : Convention of Evangelical Baptist Churches in Congo
- Democratic Republic of the Congo : Baptist Church of Congo
- Democratic Republic of the Congo : Baptist Community in Central Africa
- Democratic Republic of the Congo : Baptist Evangelical Convention of Congo
- Democratic Republic of the Congo : Community of Autonomous Baptist Churches Wamba-Bakali
- Democratic Republic of the Congo : Community of Baptist Churches of Eastern Congo
- Democratic Republic of the Congo : Community of Baptist Churches in North Congo
- Democratic Republic of the Congo : Community of Baptist Churches Union of Congo
- Democratic Republic of the Congo : Community of United Baptist Churches
- Democratic Republic of the Congo : Community of Independent Baptist Evangelical Churches
- Democratic Republic of the Congo : Union of Baptist Churches of Congo
- Equatorial Guinea : Equatorial Guinea Baptist Church
- Ethiopia : Ethiopian Addis Kidan Baptist Church
- Ethiopia : Emmanuel Baptist Church of Ethiopia
- Ethiopia : Evangelical Baptist Church of Ethiopia
- Gambia : Baptist Union of the Gambia
- Ghana : Ghana Baptist Convention
- Ivory Coast : Union of Missionary Baptist Churches in Ivory Coast
- Kenya : Baptist Convention of Kenya
- Liberia : Liberia Baptist Missionary and Educational Convention
- Madagascar : Association of Bible Baptist Churches in Madagascar
- Malawi : African Baptist Assembly of Malawi, Inc.
- Malawi : Baptist Convention of Malawi
- Malawi : Evangelical Baptist Church of Malawi
- Mauritius : Baptist Association of Mauritius
- Mozambique : Baptist Convention of Mozambique
- Namibia : Baptist Convention of Namibia
- Niger : Union of Evangelical Baptist Churches of Niger
- Nigeria : Nigerian Baptist Convention
- Nigeria : Mambilla Baptist Convention
- Rwanda : Union of Baptist Churches in Rwanda
- Rwanda : Association of Baptist Churches in Rwanda
- Rwanda : Christian Unity Baptist Churches in Rwanda
- Rwanda : Community of Christian Churches in Africa
- Rwanda : Reformed Baptist Convention in Rwanda
- Rwanda : Seira Community Church
- São Tomé and Príncipe : Baptist Convention of São Tomé and Príncipe
- Senegal : Association of Baptist Churches of Senegal
- Sierra Leone : Baptist Convention of Sierra Leone
- South Africa : Baptist Convention of South Africa
- South Africa : Baptist Union of Southern Africa
- South Africa : Baptist Association of South Africa
- South Africa : Baptist Mission of South Africa
- South Sudan : Faith Evangelical Baptist Church of South Sudan
- South Sudan : Baptist Convention of South Sudan
- Sudan : Sudan Interior Church
- Tanzania : Baptist Convention of Tanzania
- Togo : Togo Baptist Convention
- Uganda : Baptist Union of Uganda
- Zambia : Baptist Convention of Zambia
- Zambia : Baptist Fellowship of Zambia
- Zambia : Baptist Union of Zambia
- Zimbabwe : Baptist Convention of Zimbabwe
- Zimbabwe : National Baptist Convention of Zimbabwe
- Zimbabwe : Baptist Union of Zimbabwe
- Zimbabwe : Evangelical Baptist Churches of Zimbabwe
- Zimbabwe : United Baptist Church of Zimbabwe

== International network ==
- International : International Baptist Convention

== Bibliography ==
- William H. Brackney, Historical Dictionary of the Baptists, Scarecrow Press, USA, 2009
- Robert E. Johnson, A Global Introduction to Baptist Churches, Cambridge University Press, UK, 2010
- J. Gordon Melton, Martin Baumann, Religions of the World: A Comprehensive Encyclopedia of Beliefs and Practices, ABC-CLIO, USA, 2010
