= List of Baptist denominations =

This list of Baptist denominations is a list of subdivisions of Baptists, with their various Baptist associations, conferences, conventions, fellowships, groups, and unions around the world. Unless otherwise noted, information comes from the World Baptist Alliance.

While most Baptist denominations have some type of centralized coordinating organization, the pervasive and influential nature of congregational polity means some of these denominations are only loosely bound.

== Africa ==
=== Central Africa ===
- Chadian Association of Baptist Churches
- Baptist Churches of the Central African Republic
- Evangelical Baptist Church of the Central African Republic
- Baptist Community of Congo
- Baptist Community of the Congo River
- Native Baptist Church of Cameroon
- Cameroon Baptist Convention
- Union of Baptist Churches of Cameroon

=== Southern Africa ===
- African Baptist Assembly of Malawi, Inc.
- African United Baptist Church
- Association of Bible Baptist Churches in Madagascar
- Baptist Convention of Angola
- Baptist Evangelical Association of Madagascar
- Baptist Union of Southern Africa
- Baptist Union of Zambia
- Igreja União Baptista de Moçambique
- Union of Baptist Churches in Burundi
- Union of Baptist Churches in Rwanda

=== West Africa ===
- Ghana Baptist Convention
- Nigerian Baptist Convention
- Togo Baptist Convention
- Union of Missionary Baptist Churches in Ivory Coast

=== East Africa ===
- Baptist Convention of Kenya
- Baptist Convention of Tanzania
- Sudan Interior Church

== Asia and Oceania ==
=== Regional bodies ===
- Asia Pacific Baptist Federation

=== East Asia ===
- Baptist Convention of Hong Kong
- Japan Baptist Association
- Japan Baptist Convention

==== Bangladesh ====
- Bangladesh Baptist Church Fellowship
- Bangladesh Baptist Church Sangha

==== India ====
- Angami Baptist Church Council
- Ao Baptist Arogo Mungdang
- Arunachal Baptist Church Council
- Assam Baptist Convention
- Baptist Convention Coastal Andhra
- Baptist Church of Mizoram
- Baptist Union of North India
- Bengal Baptist Fellowship
- Bengal Orissa Bihar Baptist Convention
- Boro Baptist Church Association
- Boro Baptist Convention
- Council of Baptist Churches in Northeast India
- Fellowship of Baptist Churches in Kerala
- Garo Baptist Convention
- Karbi-Anglong Baptist Convention
- Kuki Baptist Convention
- Lower Assam Baptist Union
- Manipur Baptist Convention
- Nagaland Baptist Church Council
- North Bank Baptist Christian Association
- Nyishi Baptist Church Council
- Rabha Baptist Church Union
- Samavesam of Telugu Baptist Churches
- Separate Baptists in Christ
- Seventh Day Baptist
- Tripura Baptist Christian Union of India
- Independent Baptist Ministries of India

=== Southeast Asia ===
- Malaysia Baptist Convention
- Myanmar Baptist Convention
- Singapore Baptist Convention
- Union of Indonesian Baptist Churches

==== Philippines ====
- Association of Fundamental Baptist Churches in the Philippines
- Baptist Conference of the Philippines
- Convention of Philippine Baptist Churches
- Philippine Chinese Baptist Convention

=== Oceania ===
- Baptist Union of Australia
- Baptist Union of Papua New Guinea
- Baptist Union of New Zealand
- Marianas Association of General Baptists
- Solomons Baptist Association

== The Caribbean ==
=== Barbados ===
- Spiritual Baptist

=== Cuba ===
- Baptist Convention of Eastern Cuba
- Baptist Convention of Western Cuba

=== Haiti ===
- Baptist Convention of Haiti
- Evangelical Baptist Mission of South Haiti

=== Jamaica ===
- Jamaica Baptist Union

=== Other ===
- Cayman Baptist Association

=== St. Vincent and the Grenadines ===
- Spiritual Baptist

== Europe and Eurasia ==
=== Regional bodies ===
- European Baptist Federation
- International Baptist Convention

Eurasia

- Euro-Asian Federation of Evangelical Christians-Baptists Unions
- International Union of Churches of Evangelical Christians-Baptists

=== Continental Europe ===
- All-Ukrainian Union of Churches of Evangelical Christian Baptists
- Association of Baptist Churches in Ireland
- Baptist Evangelical Christian Union of Italy
- Unity of the Brethren Baptists in the Czech Republic
- Baptist Union of Croatia
- Baptist Union of Denmark
- Baptist Union of Hungary
- Baptist Union of Norway
- Baptist Union of Poland
- Baptist Union of Romania
- Baptist Union of Sweden
- Brotherhood of Baptist Churches
- Brotherhood of Independent Baptist Churches and Ministries of Ukraine
- Convention of the Hungarian Baptist Churches of Romania
- Evangelical Reformed Baptist Churches in Italy
- Federation of Evangelical Baptist Churches of France
- Swedish Baptist Union of Finland
- Union of Baptist Churches in the Netherlands
- Union of the Baptist Christians in North Macedonia
- Union of Baptist Churches in Serbia
- Union of Baptists in Belgium
- Union of Christian Evangelical Baptist Churches of Moldova
- Baptist Evangelical Union of Spain
- Union of Christian Baptist Churches in Serbia
- Union of Evangelical Free Church Congregations in Germany

=== Eurasia ===
- Russian Union of Evangelical Christians-Baptists
- Union of Evangelical Christian Baptists of Kazakhstan

=== United Kingdom ===
- Baptists Together (England and Wales)
- Baptist Union of Scotland
- Baptist Union of Wales
- Fellowship of Independent Evangelical Churches - All Reformed, mostly Baptist
- Associations of Grace Baptist Churches
- Old Baptist Union
- Strict Baptists

=== Middle East ===
- Association of Baptist Churches in Israel
- Lebanese Baptist Convention

== North America ==
=== Canada ===
- Association of Regular Baptist Churches
- Baptist General Conference of Canada
- Canadian Baptist Ministries
- Canadian National Baptist Convention
- Central Canada Baptist Conference
- Convention of Atlantic Baptist Churches
- Covenanted Baptist Church of Canada
- Baptist Convention of Ontario and Quebec
- Baptist Union of Western Canada
- Fellowship of Evangelical Baptist Churches in Canada
- Landmark Missionary Baptist Association of Quebec
- North American Baptist Conference
- Primitive Baptist Conference of New Brunswick, Maine and Nova Scotia
- Sovereign Grace Fellowship of Canada
- Ukrainian Evangelical Baptist Convention of Canada
- Union of French Baptist Churches of Canada
- Union of Slavic Churches of Evangelical Christians and Slavic Baptists of Canada

=== Mexico ===
- National Baptist Convention of Mexico (Convención Nacional Bautista de Mexico)

=== United States ===
==== National bodies ====
- Missionary Baptist Conference, U.S.A.
- Alliance of Baptists
- American Baptist Association
- American Baptist Churches in the USA
- Confessional Baptist Association
- Association of Welcoming and Affirming Baptists
- Baptist Bible Fellowship International
- Baptist Missionary Association of America
- Central Baptist Association
- Venture Church Network
- Converge (formerly Baptist General Conference)
- Cooperative Baptist Fellowship
- Enterprise Association of Regular Baptists
- Free Will Baptist
- Full Gospel Baptist Church Fellowship
- Fundamental Baptist Fellowship Association
- Fundamental Baptist Fellowship of America
- General Association of Baptists
- General Association of General Baptists
- General Association of Regular Baptist Churches
- General Conference of the Evangelical Baptist Church, Inc.
- General Six-Principle Baptists
- Independent Baptist Fellowship International
- Independent Baptist Fellowship of North America
- Institutional Missionary Baptist Conference of America
- Interstate & Foreign Landmark Missionary Baptist Association
- Landmark Baptists
- Liberty Baptist Fellowship
- National Association of Free Will Baptists
- National Baptist Convention of America, Inc.
- National Baptist Convention, USA, Inc.
- National Baptist Evangelical Life and Soul Saving Assembly of the U.S.A.
- National Missionary Baptist Convention of America
- National Primitive Baptist Convention of the U.S.A.
- North American Baptist Conference
- Old Regular Baptist
- Old Time Missionary Baptist
- Original Free Will Baptist Convention
- Primitive Baptist Universalists
- Primitive Baptists
- Progressive National Baptist Convention
- Reformed Baptist
- Regular Baptist
- Separate Baptist
- Separate Baptists in Christ
- Seventh Day Baptist General Conference
- Southern Baptist Convention
- Southwide Baptist Fellowship
- Sovereign Grace Baptists
- Two-Seed-in-the-Spirit Predestinarian Baptists
- United American Free Will Baptist Church
- United American Free Will Baptist Conference
- United Baptist
- World Baptist Fellowship
- American Baptists Mormon Witnesses of Latter Day Saints

==== State and interstate bodies ====
- Baptist General Association of Virginia
- Baptist General Convention of Oklahoma
- Baptist General Convention of Texas
- District of Columbia Baptist Convention
- Interstate & Foreign Landmark Missionary Baptists Association
- List of state and other conventions associated with the Southern Baptist Convention
- Minnesota Baptist Association
- New England Evangelical Baptist Fellowship
- Southern Baptists of Texas Convention
- Wisconsin Fellowship of Baptist Churches

== Central and South America ==
=== Central America ===
- Baptist Convention of Costa Rica
- Baptist Convention of Nicaragua
- Baptist Convention of Panama
- National Union of Baptist Churches

=== South America ===
- Evangelical Baptist Convention of Argentina

==== Brazil ====
- Brazilian Baptist Convention
- National Baptist Convention
- Convention of Independent Baptist Churches
- Association of Regular Baptist Churches of Brazil
- Reformed Baptist Convention of Brazil
- Alliance of Baptists of Brazil

== Other ==
=== Global ===
- Baptist World Alliance
- Independent Baptist
- Independent Fundamental Baptist
- New Independent Fundamentalist Baptist
- Woman's Missionary Union
- Swedish Baptists

== See also ==
- Baptists in Sichuan
- List of Reformed Baptist denominations
- List of Primitive Baptist churches

== Bibliography ==
- William H. Brackney, Historical Dictionary of the Baptists, Scarecrow Press, USA, 2009
- Robert E. Johnson, A Global Introduction to Baptist Churches, Cambridge University Press, UK, 2010
- J. Gordon Melton, Martin Baumann, Religions of the World: A Comprehensive Encyclopedia of Beliefs and Practices, ABC-CLIO, USA, 2010
