= Protestantism in Cuba =

While Protestants arrived in the island of Cuba early in its colonial days, most of their churches did not flourish until the 20th century with the assistance of American missionaries. In the early 20th century, Cuban Protestant churches were greatly aided by various American missionaries who assisted in the work in the churches and also provided support from their home churches. When Fidel Castro’s regime overtook the country in 1959, Protestant churches were legally allowed to continue. Nevertheless, certain incidents as detailed below, and religious persecution kept them from prospering. During the Special Period that began in 1991, Protestant churches began to flourish once again and today have become a primary religious group of Cuba. The Protestant population of Cuba is estimated at 11%.

== Early Protestants in Cuba ==
Cuba was one of Spain’s last colonies to be established in the New World. In the beginning, Catholic Spain zealously tried to keep the Protestants out of their colony as they promoted “monarchical absolutism” and “Catholic unity.” The earliest Protestant activity in Cuba dates back to 1741 when Cuba was under British occupation. Moreover, as trade opened up between Cuba and the United States as well as other Protestant nations in Europe, the walls keeping Protestants out of Cuba were broken down. Many Protestants began to make their home in Cuba. Several more Protestants influenced the culture and society by coming to trade or vacation on the island. Even with the opening of trade, tensions remained strong between Catholics and Protestants in Cuba throughout the early days of the colony.

== Protestant churches in Cuba ==
Many of the Protestant churches in Cuba have ties to the United States through various missionary activity. The Baptist Convention of Cuba is an influential Protestant group that was begun by a Cuban exile who was associated with the American Southern Baptist Convention. He returned in 1883 to spread Bibles in the west and south of Cuba. They help to make up the third largest denomination along with the North American Baptist Missionaries who work in the east. One of the main Protestant churches in Cuba today is the Iglesia Evangélica Pentecostal which originated in 1920 with help from American missionaries of the Assemblies of God. Presbyterian churches from America planted the Reformed Presbyterian Church in Cuba.

== Protestant churches during the Revolution ==
In 1959, Fidel Castro stated that he did not have problems with the Protestants who were more tolerant than the Catholics of his social policies. Yet, this religious tolerance did not last long. Many Protestants suffered harassment at the hands of the Revolutionaries. Some were sent to labor camps where they were abused physically and verbally. Also many churches experienced harassment in the form of “The Street Plan” which was an organized activity outside of the church with the purpose of distracting from the services. Furthermore, in 1965, thirty Baptist preachers were accused of being American spies and were imprisoned. In June 1984, Jesse Jackson visited Cuba and influenced the release of 22 religious prisoners. Through these years, Protestant Churches had to be creative with their evangelism, disguising their outreaches as musical or cultural programs.

== Protestant schools ==
In the early 20th century, the American Protestants who came to Cuba began to spread their religious and economic ideas through a vast education system that included elementary and secondary schools, Sunday Schools, Bible camps, and seminaries. Besides their desire to evangelize the local Cubans, their goal was to shape Cuban society after the American values that they brought to the schools. In these schools, upper and middle class Cubans were prepared for leadership positions, while lower class citizens were educated to become workers in occupations such as secretaries and housekeepers. Before the Cuban Revolution, these Protestant schools succeeded in training thousands of students with their American ideals. Several Cuban graduates of this school system eventually became leaders in government posts at the time of the revolution.

Despite the political and economic uncertainty the Revolution brought to Cuba, the Cuban Protestant Schools remained stable for a time due to their outside support from U.S. mission agencies. However, as time went on, relationships between Cuba and the U.S. became increasingly unstable and Protestant schools and churches depended heavily on the U.S. churches for money, workers, and theological training. As a result of the growing U.S.-Cuban conflict, the Cuban Protestant’s association with the U.S. became a burden to these churches and schools and many of them were forced to close down. At this time, a primary reform of the Revolutionary government was free education for people of any race and age. So, at the same time these once thriving Protestant schools were closed down, education in Cuba was offered freely to the masses for the first time. In contrast to the education provided at the Protestant schools, the Revolutionary schools taught their students with an atheistic ideology.

== Today ==
In 1985, Fidel Castro met with Catholic and Protestant leaders to express his views on religion. By September, he asked his political party to respect these religious groups and promised to help solve the material needs of these churches. In 1986, the government official in charge of religious affairs gave an interview saying that atheism would no longer be the primary ideology of the government.

Soon after, Protestant churches began to thrive in Cuba once again, and their numbers doubled in the 1990s during the Special Period. This era of church growth has been called the “Great Awakening.” In 1998 it was reported that Protestants have successfully come to rival Roman Catholics for the number of followers in Cuba as 500,000 Catholics attend services weekly followed closely by 400,000 Protestants. In 1999, Pope John Paul II visited Cuba which brought a significant amount of religious tolerance and awareness to the nation. Later that year, the Cuban government declared that Christmas could be celebrated as an official holiday. Today, some of Cuba’s Protestant churches are united by The Ecumenical Council of Cuba. With fourteen member churches, this group seeks to influence the culture of Cuba. Their mission is to promote church and society, Christian education, Ecumenical education, laity, Bible reading, and the youth of Cuba. The majority of Cuban Protestants, however do not belong to the Ecumenical Council of Cuba. This includes the Eastern and Western Baptist Conventions and the Assemblies of God denomination which are the largest Protestant denominations on the island.

The Gustav-Adolf-Werk (GAW) as the Evangelical Church in Germany Diaspora agency recently started to actively support persecuted Protestant Christians in Cuba. A current project in Cuba includes a congregation center in Havannna, the cooperation is a sort of new approach for the GAW which had not been active in the region before.

== Recent Evangelical Protestant revival ==
In recent decades Cuba has seen a rapid growth of Evangelical Protestants: "Cuba’s Christians have thrived despite the island’s politics and poverty. Their improbable, decades-long revival is often described as being rivaled only by China’s. “It’s incredible. People just come on their own, looking for God,” says a Western Baptist leader."

== Additional notes ==
Protestantism was introduced to Cuba by the British in 1741 and especially after their conquest of Western Cuba in 1762.
Since 1991 religious believers are permitted to be members of the Cuban Communist Party.
Christmas became a National Holiday in 1998.
There are rarely building licenses for churches.
In March 2007 some Baptist groups received official recognition.

== List of denominations ==
- Asambleas de Dios
- Asociación Evangelica de Cuba
- Calvary Chapel Association
- Convención Bautista de Cuba Occidental
- Covención Bautista de Cuba Oriental
- Ejército de Salvación
- Hermanos Libres
- Iglesia Adventista del Séptimo Día
- Iglesia de Dios
- Iglesia de Dios en Profecía
- Iglesia de Dios en Cuba
- Iglesia de los Amigos
- Iglesia Episcopal de Cuba
- Iglesia Episcopal Reformada
- Iglesia del Evangelio Cuadrangular
- Iglesia del Nazareno
- Iglesia Evangélica Independiente
- Iglesia Luterana de Cuba (Misurí)
- Iglesia Metodista en Cuba
- Iglesia Pentecostal Buenas Nuevas
- Iglesia Santa Pentecostés
- Iglesias Elim
- Monte Sinaí Iglesia de América

Source of the list: The World Christian Encyclopedia, Second edition, Volume 1, p. 228; and other few denominations that are not listed on the Encyclopedia.

== See also ==
- Baptist Convention of Eastern Cuba
- Baptist Convention of Western Cuba
- Iglesia Episcopal de Cuba
