= Cambodia Baptist Union =

The Cambodia Baptist Union (CBU, also known as the Cambodian Baptist Convention) is a Baptist Christian denomination in Cambodia. It is affiliated with the Evangelical Fellowship of Cambodia, Kampuchea Christian Council, and the Baptist World Alliance.

== History ==
Although Baptist missions have been noted in Cambodia since at least 1953, due to the turbulent contemporary history of Cambodia, the CBU was only organized in 1995 as the Khmer Baptist Convention.

According to a census published by the association in 2023, it claimed 22,531 members and 527 churches.

== Affiliations ==
The CBU participates actively in ecumenical relationships through:

- Evangelical Fellowship of Cambodia
  - Evangelical Fellowship of Asia
  - World Evangelical Alliance
- Kampuchea Christian Council
  - Christian Conference of Asia
  - World Council of Churches
- Baptist World Alliance
  - Asia Pacific Baptist Federation

== See also ==
- Christianity in Cambodia
- Bible
- Born again
- Baptist beliefs
- Jesus Christ
- Believers' Church
