= Ecuadorian Baptist Convention =

- Convención Bautista Ecuatoriana
- Classification: Evangelical Christianity
- Theology: Baptist
- Associations: Baptist World Alliance
- Headquarters: Guayaquil, Ecuador
- Origin: 1972
- Congregations: 248
- Members: 23,560
- Official website: convencionbautistaec.com

The Ecuadorian Baptist Convention (Spanish: Convención Bautista Ecuatoriana) is a Baptist Christian denomination in Ecuador. It is affiliated with the Baptist World Alliance. The headquarters is in Guayaquil.

== History ==
The Ecuadorian Baptist Convention has its origins in an American mission of the International Mission Board in 1950. It is officially founded in 1972. According to a census published by the association in 2023, it claimed 248 churches and 23,560 members.

== See also ==
- Bible
- Born again
- Baptist beliefs
- Jesus Christ
- Believers' Church
