= Ethiopian Addis Kidan Baptist Church =

- Classification: Evangelical Christianity
- Theology: Baptist
- Associations: Baptist World Alliance
- Headquarters: Addis Ababa, Ethiopia
- Origin: 1989
- Congregations: 147
- Members: 42,270
- Official website: ethiopianaddiskidan.org

The Ethiopian Addis Kidan Baptist Church is a Baptist Christian denomination in Ethiopia. It is affiliated with the Baptist World Alliance. The headquarters is in Addis Ababa.

== History ==
The Ethiopian Addis Kidan Baptist Church has its origins in an American mission of the International Mission Board in 1965. It is officially founded in 1989. According to a census published by the association in 2023, it claimed 147 churches and 42,270 members.

== See also ==
- Bible
- Born again
- Baptist beliefs
- Jesus Christ
- Believers' Church
