= Convention of Baptist Churches in Guatemala =

Association of Christian churches in Guatemala

- Convención de Iglesias Bautista de Guatemala
- Classification: Evangelical Christianity
- Theology: Baptist
- Associations: Baptist World Alliance
- Headquarters: Guatemala City, Guatemala
- Origin: 1946
- Congregations: 889
- Members: 73,100
- Official website: convenciondeiglesiasbautistadeguatemala.org

The Convention of Baptist Churches in Guatemala (Spanish: Convención de Iglesias Bautista de Guatemala) is a Baptist Christian denomination in Guatemala. It is affiliated with the Baptist World Alliance. The headquarters is in Guatemala City.

== History ==
The Convention of Baptist Churches in Guatemala has its origins in an American mission of the International Mission Board in 1946. It is officially founded that same year. According to a census published by the association in 2023, it claimed 889 churches and 73,100 members.

== See also ==
- Bible
- Born again
- Baptist beliefs
- Jesus Christ
- Believers' Church
