= Bahamas National Baptist Missionary and Educational Convention =

- Classification: Evangelical Christianity
- Theology: Baptist
- Associations: Baptist World Alliance
- Headquarters: Nassau, Bahamas
- Origin: 1935
- Congregations: 700
- Members: 88,000
- Tertiary institutions: Bahamas Baptist University College

The Bahamas National Baptist Missionary and Educational Convention is a Baptist Christian denomination in Bahamas. It is affiliated with the Baptist World Alliance. The headquarters is in Nassau.

== History ==
The convention has its origins in the founding of Bethel Baptist Chapel in 1790 in Delancy Town (now Nassau) by two African-Americans, Prince Williams and Sharper Morris. In 1833, a British mission of the Baptist Missionary Society supported the planting of new churches. In 1892, the Bahamas Baptist Union was founded. In 1925, an American mission from the National Baptist Convention, USA helped found a women's mission organization. In 1935, the Bahamas Baptist Union and other unions founded the convention. According to a census published by the association in 2023, it claimed 700 churches and 88,000 members.

== Schools ==
In 1995, it established the Bahamas Baptist University College in Nassau.

== See also ==
- Bible
- Born again
- Baptist beliefs
- Jesus Christ
- Believers' Church
