= Baptist Union of Uganda =

Christian denomination in Uganda

- Classification: Protestant
- Orientation: Baptist
- Scripture: Protestant Bible
- Theology: Evangelical Baptist
- Associations: Baptist World Alliance
- Headquarters: Kampala, Uganda
- Origin: 1974
- Congregations: 1,800
- Members: 550,000
- Seminaries: Uganda Baptist Seminary
- Official website: baptistunionofuganda.com

The Baptist Union of Uganda is a Baptist Christian denomination in Uganda. It is affiliated with the Baptist World Alliance. The headquarters is in Kampala.

== History ==
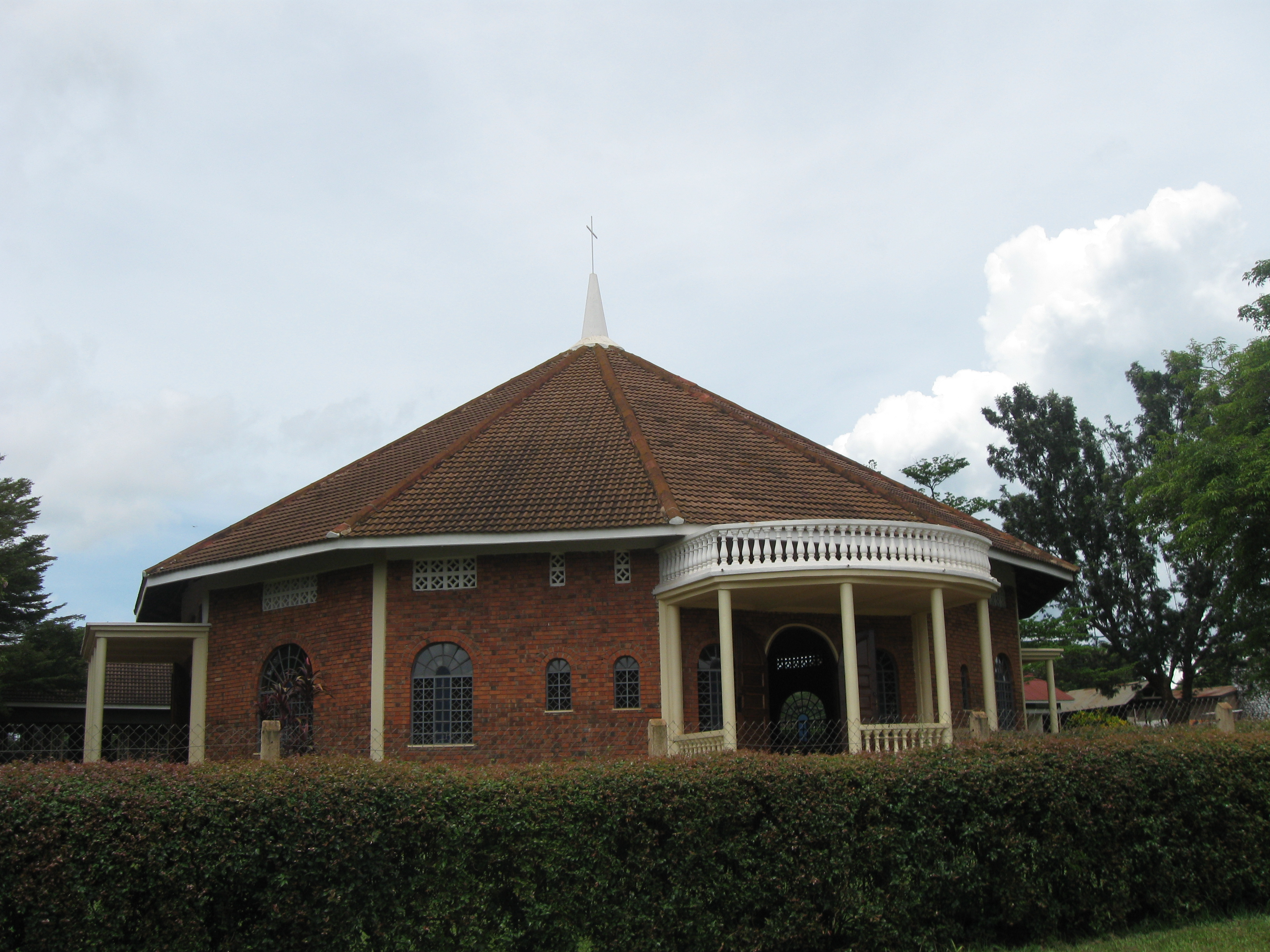
Victoria Baptist Church in Jinja, Uganda.

The Baptist Union of Uganda has its origins in an American mission of the International Mission Board in 1963. It is officially founded in 1974. According to a census published by the association in 2023, it claimed 1,800 churches and 550,000 members.

== Schools ==
It has 1 affiliated theological institute, the Uganda Baptist Seminary in Jinja, Uganda founded in 1988.

== See also ==
- Bible
- Born again
- Baptist beliefs
- Jesus Christ
- Believers' Church
