= Baptist Evangelical Church in Angola =

- Igreja Baptista Evangélica em Angola
- Abbreviation: IEBA
- Classification: Evangelical Christianity
- Theology: Baptist
- Associations: Baptist World Alliance
- Headquarters: Luanda, Angola
- Origin: 1977
- Congregations: 415
- Members: 174,218

The Baptist Evangelical Church in Angola (Portuguese: Igreja Baptista Evangélica em Angola) is a Baptist Christian denomination in Angola. It is affiliated with the Baptist World Alliance. The headquarters is in Luanda.

== History ==
The Union has its origins in a British mission of the Baptist Missionary Society and the founding of a church in 1878 in Mbanza-Kongo. It was officially founded in 1977. In 2008, it was recognized as a social partner of the State by the government due to its actions in the fields of education and health.

According to a census published by the association in 2023, it claimed 415 churches and 174,218 members.

== Schools ==
It has 34 affiliated schools.

== Health Services ==
It has an eye center in Mbanza-Kongo.

== See also ==
- Bible
- Born again
- Baptist beliefs
- Jesus Christ
- Believers' Church
