= Baptist Evangelical Convention of Paraguay =

- Convención Evangélica Bautista del Paraguay
- Classification: Evangelical Christianity
- Theology: Baptist
- Associations: Baptist World Alliance
- Headquarters: Asunción, Paraguay
- Origin: 1956
- Congregations: 290
- Members: 21,500

The Baptist Evangelical Convention of Paraguay (Spanish: Convención Evangélica Bautista del Paraguay) is a Baptist Christian denomination in Paraguay. It is affiliated with the Baptist World Alliance. The headquarters is in Asunción.

== History ==
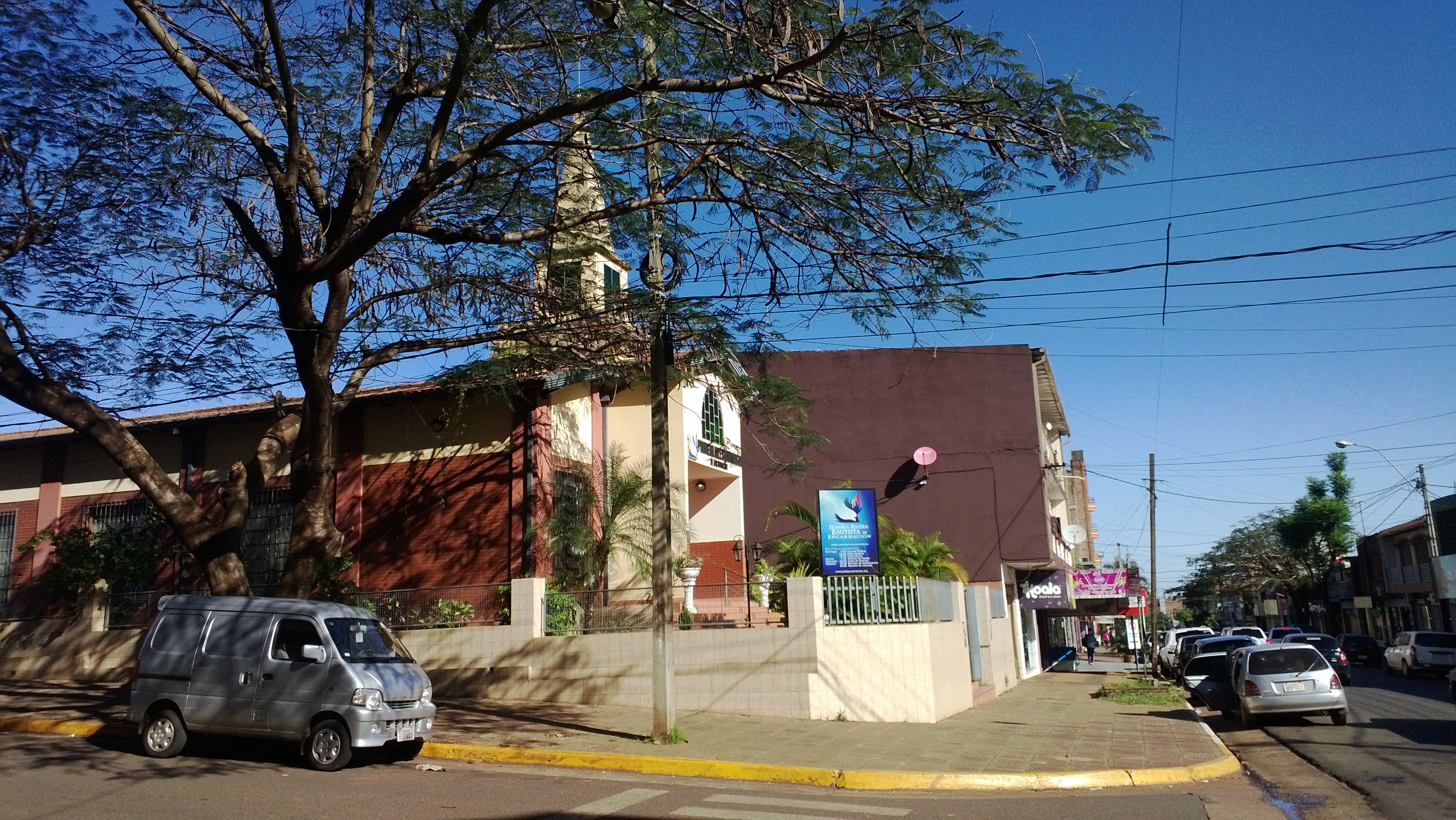
Baptist church of Encarnación, Paraguay

The Baptist Evangelical Convention of Paraguay has its origins in a mission of the Evangelical Baptist Convention of Argentina in 1919. It is officially founded in 1956. According to a census published by the association in 2023, it claimed 290 churches and 21,500 members.

== See also ==
- Born again
- Baptist beliefs
- Believers' Church
