= Baptist Association of Belize =

Christian denomination

- Classification: Evangelical Christianity
- Theology: Baptist
- Associations: Baptist World Alliance
- Headquarters: Belize City, Belize
- Origin: 1976; 50 years ago
- Congregations: 52
- Members: 4,000
- Official website: www.baptistworld.org/baptist-association-of-belize/

The Baptist Association of Belize is a Baptist Christian denomination in Belize. It is affiliated with the Baptist World Alliance. The headquarters is in Belize City.

== History ==
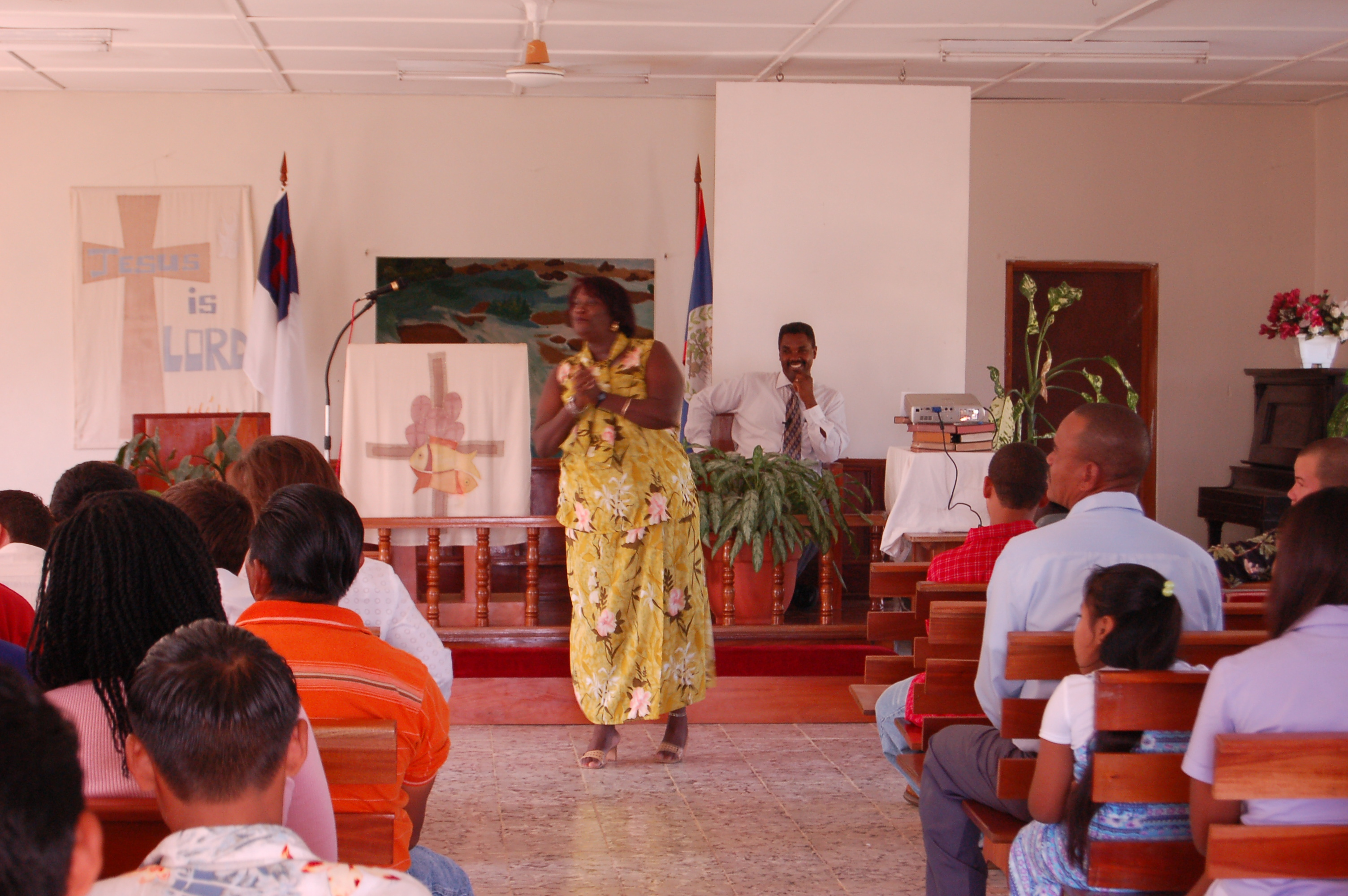
Worship service at Belmopan Baptist Church in Belmopan.

The Baptist Association of Belize has its origins in a British mission of the BMS World Mission in 1822. It is officially founded in 1976. According to a census published by the association in 2023, it claimed 52 churches and 4,000 members.

== See also ==
- Bible
- Born again
- Baptist beliefs
- Jesus Christ
- Believers' Church
