= National Convention of Baptist Churches in Honduras =

- Convención Nacional de Iglesias Bautistas de Honduras
- Classification: Evangelical Christianity
- Theology: Baptist
- Associations: Baptist World Alliance
- Headquarters: Tegucigalpa, Honduras
- Origin: 1958
- Congregations: 532
- Members: 23,660
- Official website: conibah.com

The National Convention of Baptist Churches in Honduras (Spanish: Convención Nacional de Iglesias Bautistas de Honduras) is a Baptist Christian denomination in Honduras. It is affiliated with the Baptist World Alliance. The headquarters is in Tegucigalpa.

== History ==
The National Convention of Baptist Churches in Honduras has its origins in an American mission of the International Mission Board in 1946. en It is officially founded in 1958. According to a census published by the association in 2023, it claimed 532 churches and 23,660 members.

== See also ==
- Bible
- Born again
- Baptist beliefs
- Jesus Christ
- Believers' Church
