= Colombian Baptist Denomination =

Baptist Christian denomination in Colombia

- Denominación Bautista Colombiana
- Classification: Evangelical Christianity
- Theology: Baptist
- Associations: Baptist World Alliance
- Headquarters: Bogotá, Colombia
- Origin: 1952
- Congregations: 202
- Members: 21,844
- Seminaries: International Baptist Theological Seminary in Cali
- Official website: dbc.com.co

The Colombian Baptist Denomination (Spanish: Denominación Bautista Colombiana) is a Baptist Christian denomination in Colombia. It is affiliated with the Baptist World Alliance. The headquarters is in Bogotá.

== History ==
The Convention traces its origins in an American Mission of the International Mission Board in 1941. It was officially founded in 1952 as the Colombian Baptist Convention. In 1952, it founded the International Baptist Theological Seminary in Cali. According to a census published by the association in 2023, it claimed 202 churches and 21,844 members.

== See also ==
- Bible
- Born again
- Baptist beliefs
- Jesus Christ
- Believers' Church
