= Union of Evangelical Baptist Churches of Chile =

- Unión de Iglesias Evangélicas Bautistas de Chile
- Classification: Evangelical Christianity
- Theology: Baptist
- Associations: Baptist World Alliance
- Headquarters: Santiago, Chile
- Origin: 1908
- Congregations: 539
- Members: 25,749
- Missionary organization: Dirección Nacional de Misiones
- Aid organization: Fundación Bautista PARA AMAR
- Seminaries: Baptist Theological Seminary of Santiago
- Official website: ubach.cl

The Union of Evangelical Baptist Churches of Chile (Spanish: Unión de Iglesias Evangélicas Bautistas de Chile) is a Baptist Christian denomination in Chile. It is affiliated with the Baptist World Alliance. The headquarters is in Santiago.

== History ==
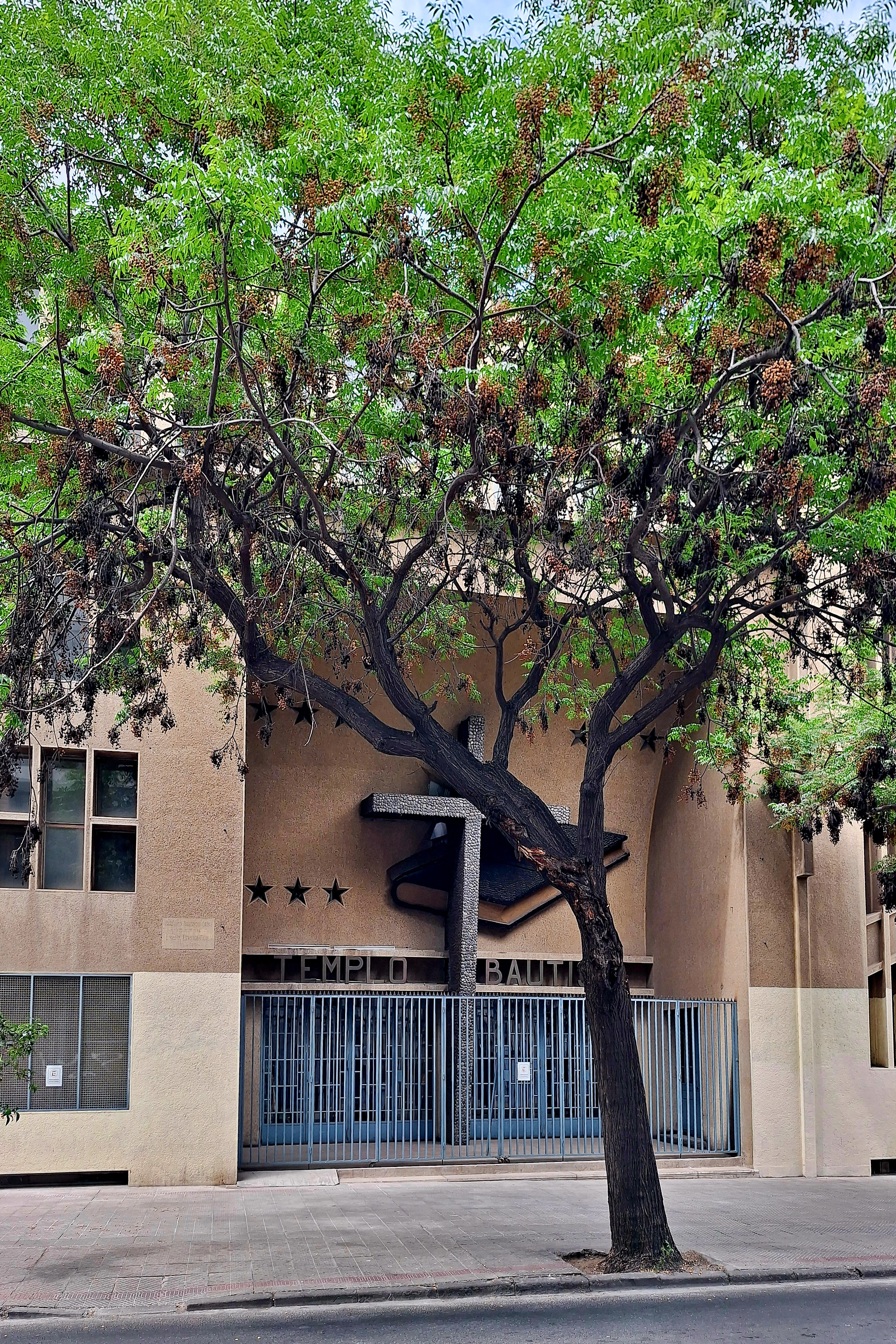
First Evangelical Baptist Church of Santiago.

The Union has its origins in a mission of Scottish pastor Daniel T. MacDonald in 1890. It was officially founded in 1908 in Cajón, near Temuco, by 6 churches under the name Convención Evangélica Bautista de Chile. In 2001, it took its current name. According to a census published by the association in 2023, it claimed 539 churches and 25,749 members.

== Schools ==
In 1938, it founded the Baptist Theological Seminary of Santiago.

== Missionary organization ==
The convention has a missionary organization, Dirección Nacional de Misiones.

== Humanitarian organization ==
It has a humanitarian organization, Fundación Bautista PARA AMAR.

== See also ==
- Bible
- Born again
- Baptist beliefs
- Jesus Christ
- Believers' Church
