= Bolivian Baptist Union =

- Unión Bautista Boliviana
- Classification: Evangelical Christianity
- Theology: Baptist
- Associations: Baptist World Alliance
- Headquarters: Cochabamba, Bolivia
- Origin: 1936
- Congregations: 267
- Members: 50,580
- Seminaries: Baptist Theological Seminary in Cochabamba
- Official website: ubbweb.com

The Bolivian Baptist Union (Spanish: Unión Bautista Boliviana) is a Baptist Christian denomination in Bolivia. It is affiliated with the Baptist World Alliance. The headquarters is in Cochabamba.

== History ==
The Union has its origins in a Canadian Baptist mission in 1898 in Oruro. It was officially founded in 1936. In 1941, it founded the Baptist Theological Seminary in Cochabamba. According to a census published by the association in 2023, it claimed 267 churches and 50,580 members.

== See also ==
- Bible
- Born again
- Baptist beliefs
- Jesus Christ
- Believers' Church
