= National Baptist Convention of Venezuela =

- Convención Nacional Bautista de Venezuela
- Classification: Evangelical Christianity
- Theology: Baptist
- Associations: Baptist World Alliance
- Headquarters: Caracas, Venezuela
- Origin: 1951
- Congregations: 725
- Members: 45,000
- Seminaries: Venezuela Baptist Theological Seminary in Los Teques
- Official website: cnbv.org

The National Baptist Convention of Venezuela (Spanish: Convención Nacional Bautista de Venezuela) is a Baptist Christian denomination in Venezuela. It is affiliated with the Baptist World Alliance. The headquarters is in Caracas.

== History ==
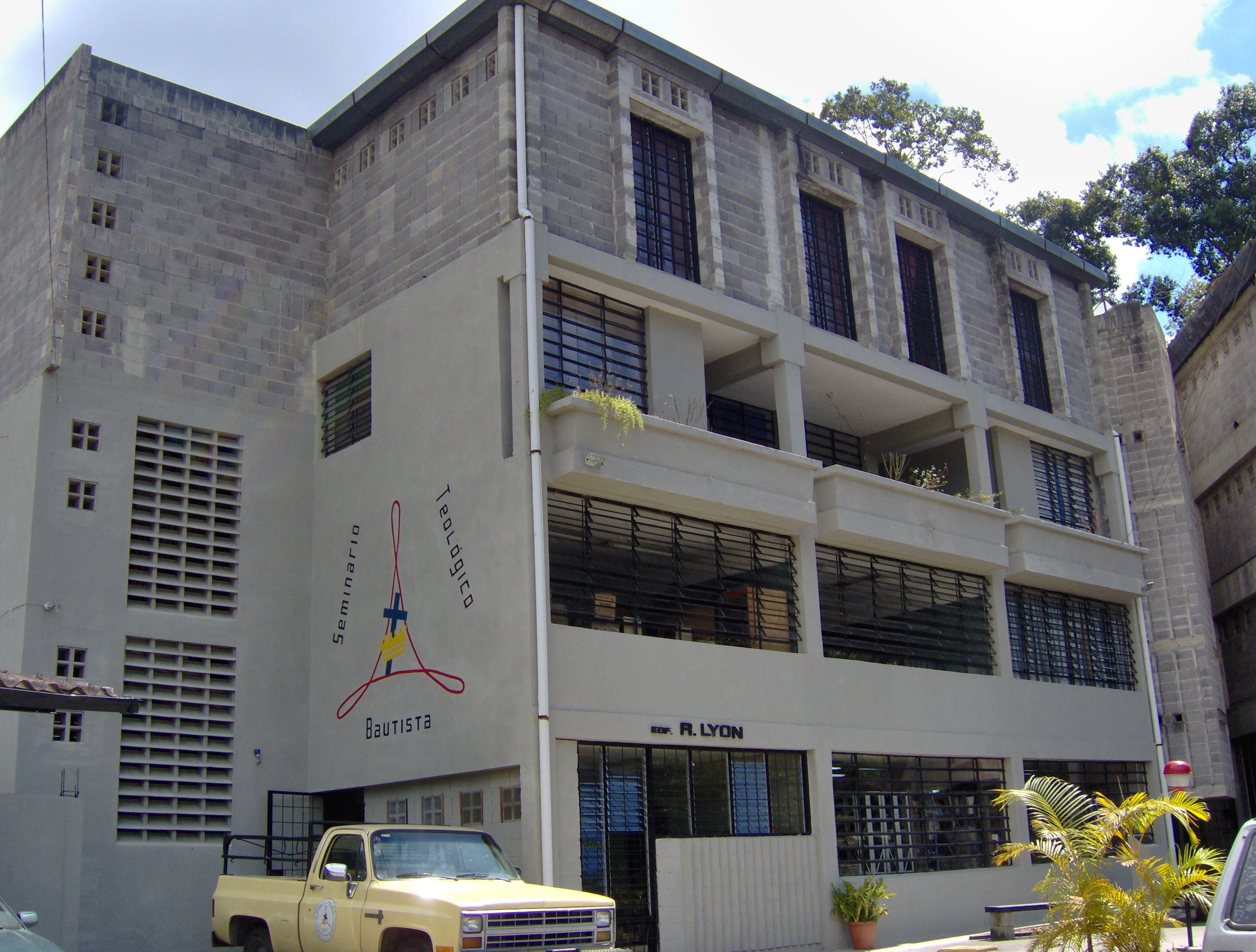
Venezuela Baptist Theological Seminary in Los Teques.

The convention has its origins in an American mission of the International Mission Board in 1946 in Caracas. It was officially founded in 1951 by 6 churches. In 1956, it founded the Venezuela Baptist Theological Seminary in Los Teques. According to a census published by the association in 2023, it claimed 725 churches and 45,000 members.

== See also ==
- Baptist beliefs
- Believers' Church
- Born again
