= Baptist Convention of Nicaragua =

Baptist Christian denomination in Nicaragua

- Convención Bautista de Nicaragua
- Classification: Evangelical Christianity
- Theology: Baptist
- Associations: Baptist World Alliance
- Headquarters: Managua, Nicaragua
- Origin: 1937
- Congregations: 289
- Members: 85,000
- Hospitals: Baptist Hospital of Managua
- Seminaries: Nicaraguan Baptist Theological Seminary in Masaya
- Official website: cbnicaragua.org

The Baptist Convention of Nicaragua (Spanish: Convención Bautista de Nicaragua) is a Baptist Christian denomination in Nicaragua. It is affiliated with the Baptist World Alliance. The headquarters is in Managua.

== History ==
The Baptist Convention of Nicaragua has its origins in a mission of the American Baptist International Ministries in 1917. It is officially founded in 1937. In 1941, it founded the Nicaraguan Baptist Theological Seminary in Masaya, which moved to Managua in 1951. According to a census published by the association in 2023, it claimed 289 churches and 85,000 members.

== Health Services ==
It is a partner of the Baptist Hospital of Managua, founded in 1930.

== See also ==
- Bible
- Born again
- Baptist beliefs
- Jesus Christ
- Believers' Church
