= Baptist Convention of Angola =

- Convenção Baptista de Angola
- Classification: Evangelical Christianity
- Theology: Baptist
- Associations: Baptist World Alliance
- Headquarters: Luanda, Angola
- Origin: 1940
- Congregations: 379
- Members: 37,500
- Official website: cba-angola.org

The Baptist Convention of Angola (Portuguese: Convenção Baptista de Angola) is a Baptist Christian denomination in Angola. It is affiliated with the Baptist World Alliance. The headquarters is in Luanda.

== History ==
The organization has its origins in a Portuguese mission in 1927 and 1929. It was officially founded in 1940. After the war for independence ended in 1975, the convention had a period of natural stagnation owing to the civil war that dominated the next three decades. In part this stagnation was due to the forced abandonment of the country by the missionary forces from America, Portugal, Denmark and Brazil who, up to that point had led the evangelistic spread of Christianity among the Baptist churches. As a result of the lack of trained nationals (no Angolan Baptist pastor had formal training in theology or as pastors) for the conduct of evangelism, the denomination did not exceed 27 churches between 1970 and the end of 1980. This situation began to change in the mid-1980s with the return to Angola of American and Brazilian missionaries and with the consequent initiation of a Mobile Bible Institute (directed by missionary pastor Curtis Dixon). This Mobile Bible Institute played an important part in the awakening of vocational service among Angolans and the training of leaders that became evangelists and pastors in the years after 1990. It maintains two theological seminaries in the provinces of Luanda and Huambo. According to a census published by the association in 2023, it claimed 379 churches and 37,500 members.

== See also ==
- Bible
- Born again
- Baptist beliefs
- Jesus Christ
- Believers' Church
