= Union of Indonesian Baptist Churches =

- Classification: Evangelical Christianity
- Theology: Baptist
- Associations: Baptist World Alliance
- Headquarters: Jakarta, Indonesia
- Origin: 1973
- Congregations: 675
- Members: 51,100
- Official website: ggbi.or.id

The Union of Indonesian Baptist Churches is a Baptist Christian denomination in Indonesia. It is affiliated with the Baptist World Alliance. The headquarters is in Jakarta.

== History ==
The Union of Indonesian Baptist Churches has its origins in a mission of three missionaries who were expelled from China and came to Jakarta in 1951. It is officially founded in August 12, 1971. According to a census published by the association in 2023, it claimed 675 churches and 51,100 members.

== See also ==
- Bible
- Born again
- Baptist beliefs
- Jesus Christ
- Believers' Church
