= Federation of Baptist Associations of Costa Rica =

The Federation of Baptist Associations of Costa Rica (Federación de Asociaciones Bautistas de Costa Rica) is a Baptist Christian denomination of churches in Costa Rica. It is affiliated with the Baptist World Alliance.

== History ==
In 1888, the Jamaica Baptist Missionary Society sent J. H. Sobey to labor in Costa Rica. Four Baptist churches formed the Baptist Convention of Costa Rica in 1947. This convention labored in cooperation with the International Mission Board until a dispute arose in 1980 and the relationship was severed. In 1981, those wishing to continue cooperation with the International Mission Board organized the National Union of Baptist Churches.

According to a census published by the association in 2023, it claimed 2,600 members and 27 churches.

== See also ==
- Bible
- Born again
- Baptist beliefs
- Jesus Christ
- Believers' Church
