= Baptist Convention of Mozambique =

- Convenção Baptista de Moçambique
- Classification: Evangelical Christianity
- Theology: Baptist
- Associations: Baptist World Alliance
- Headquarters: Maputo, Mozambique
- Origin: 1957
- Congregations: 866
- Members: 173,200
- Official website: cbmnet.org

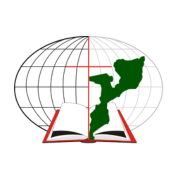
The Baptist Convention of Mozambique institutional logo

The Baptist Convention of Mozambique (Portuguese: Convenção Baptista de Moçambique) is a Baptist Christian denomination in Mozambique. It is affiliated with the Baptist World Alliance. The headquarters is in Maputo.

== History ==
The Baptist Convention of Mozambique has its origins in a mission of the National Baptist Convention, USA, Inc. in 1925. It is officially founded in 1957. According to a census published by the association in 2023, it claimed 866 churches and 173,200 members.

== See also ==
- Bible
- Born again
- Jesus Christ
- Believers' Church
