= Baptist Convention of Kenya =

Baptist Christian denomination in Kenya

Baptist Convention of Kenya (BCOK)
- Abbreviation: BCK
- Classification: Protestant
- Orientation: Baptist
- Theology: Evangelical Baptist
- Associations: Baptist World Alliance
- Headquarters: Nairobi, Kenya
- Origin: 1971
- Congregations: 3,412
- Members: 737,000
- Seminaries: 1
- Official website: bcok.org

The Baptist Convention of Kenya is a Baptist Christian denomination in Kenya. It is affiliated with the Baptist World Alliance. The headquarters is in Nairobi at Shauri Moyo Baptist Church along Jogoo Road. The current president of the Convention is Rev. Bernard Obuya deputized by Rev. Ernest K. Weringe and Rev. Dr. Peter Gitahi.

== History ==
The Convention has its origins in an American mission of the International Mission Board in 1956 in Nairobi. In 1971, the Baptist Convention of Kenya was formally founded. According to a census published by the association in 2023, it claimed 3,412 churches and 737,000 members.

== Schools ==
Baptist Convention of Kenya owns the Kenya Baptist Theological College in Limuru in 1981, Mombasa Baptist High School, and Nyeri Baptist High School.

== See also ==
- Bible
- Born again
- Baptist beliefs
- Jesus Christ
- Believers' Church
