= Federation of Evangelical Baptist Churches of France =

- Fédération des Églises évangéliques baptistes de France
- Abbreviation: FEEBF
- Classification: Evangelical Christianity
- Theology: Baptist
- Associations: Baptist World Alliance
- Headquarters: Paris
- Origin: 1922
- Congregations: 106
- Members: 5,885
- Missionary organization: EBM International
- Aid organization: Association Baptiste pour l’Entraide et la Jeunesse
- Official website: federation.feebf.com

The Federation of Evangelical Baptist Churches of France (French: Fédération des Églises évangéliques baptistes de France) is Baptist Christian denomination in France. It is affiliated with the National Council of Evangelicals of France and the Baptist World Alliance. The headquarters is in Paris.

== History ==
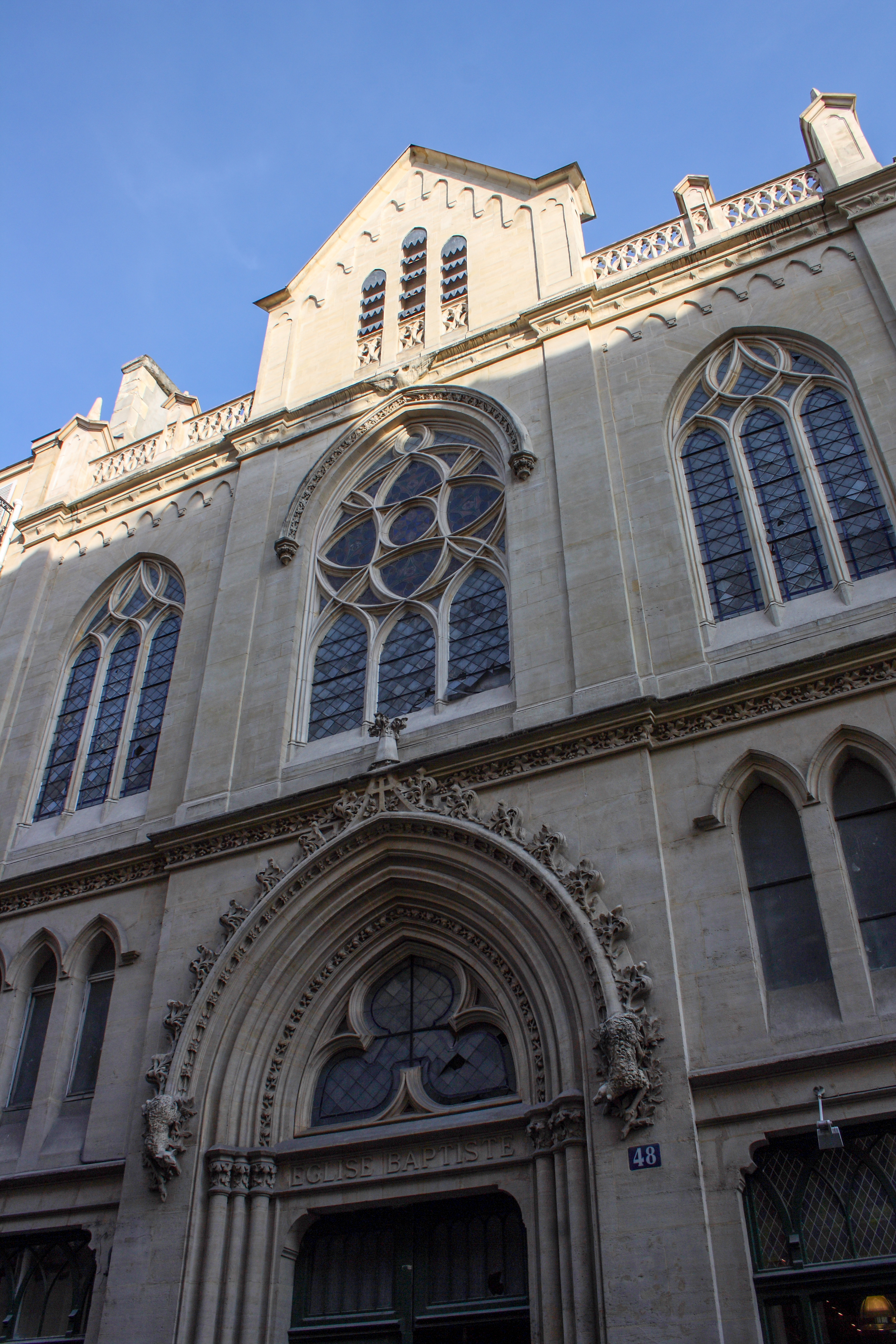
Building of the Evangelical Baptist Church of Paris, member of the federation.

The federation has its origins in a Baptist mission in Nomain, by the Swiss missionary Henri Pyt and his wife Jeanne Pyt, in 1820. In 1836, the Baptist pastoral school of Douai opened its doors. In 1838, 7 Baptist churches and 150 members were established. In 1910, ten Baptist churches founded the Federation of Evangelical Baptist Churches of Northern France. In 1922, the Federation had churches in various regions of France and was renamed the "Federation of Evangelical Baptist Churches of France". In 1937, the Federation of Baptist Churches founded the Baptist Interior Mission (MIB) to plant new churches in France. According to a census published by the association in 2023, it claimed 106 churches and 5,885 members.

== Missionary organization ==
The Convention has a missionary organization, EBM International.

== Humanitarian organization ==
It has a humanitarian organization, Association Baptiste pour l’Entraide et la Jeunesse.

== See also ==
- Bible
- Born again
- Baptist beliefs
- Jesus Christ
- Believers' Church
