= Baptist Convention of Vietnam =

Baptist Christian denomination in Vietnam

Baptist Churches in Vietnam
- Classification: Evangelical Christianity
- Theology: Baptist
- Associations: Baptist World Alliance
- Headquarters: Ho Chi Minh City, Vietnam
- Origin: 1989
- Congregations: 509
- Members: 51,000
- Official website: giaohoibaptitvietnam.org

The Baptist Churches in Vietnam is a Baptist Christian denomination in Vietnam. It is affiliated with the Baptist World Alliance. The headquarters is in Ho Chi Minh City.

== History ==
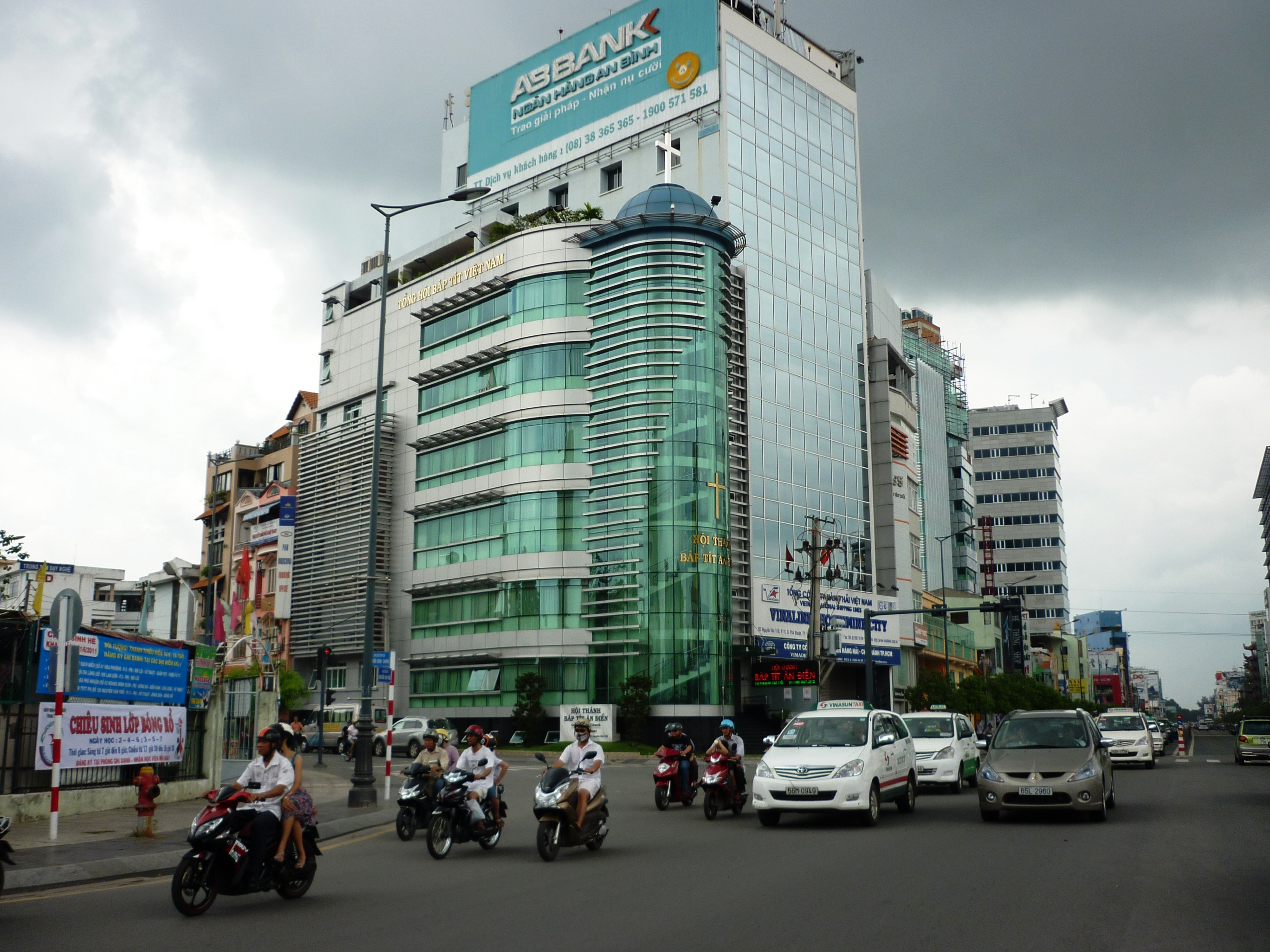
Grace Baptist Church in Ho Chi Minh City.

The Baptist Churches in Vietnam has its origins in an American mission of the International Mission Board in 1959, in Ho Chi Minh City. It is officially founded in 1989. According to a census published by the association in 2023, it claimed 509 churches and 51,000 members.

== See also ==
- Bible
- Born again
- Jesus Christ
- Believers' Church
