= National Baptist Convention of Mexico =

- Convención Nacional Bautista de México
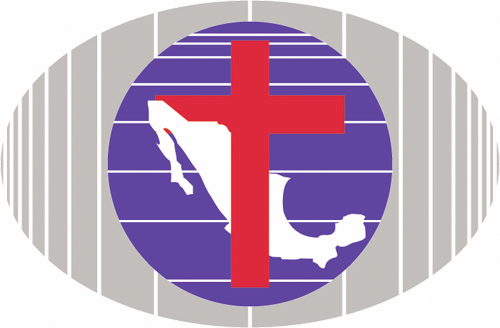
- Classification: Evangelical Christianity
- Theology: Baptist
- President: Constantino Varas de Valdes
- Headquarters: Mexico City, Mexico
- Origin: 1903
- Congregations: 1,800
- Members: 90,000
- Hospitals: 2
- Seminaries: 2
- Official website: cnbm.mx

The National Baptist Convention of Mexico (Spanish: Convención Nacional Bautista de México) is a Baptist Christian denomination in Mexico. It is affiliated with the Baptist World Alliance. The headquarters is in Mexico City, Mexico.

== History ==
The first evangelical church in Mexico was a Baptist church organized on January 30, 1864 in Monterrey, Nuevo León. James Hickey, a Baptist and a member of the American Bible Society, constituted this church with himself and four other members – Thomas Westrup, José Maria Uranga, Arcadio Uranga, and Mrs. Hickey. By 1869, Westrup and the Uranga brothers had organized six more churches. The American Baptist Home Mission Society and the International Mission Board sent about fifty missionaries to Mexico before the beginning of the 20th century. In 1884, the Coahuila Baptist Association was organized in Saltillo, and in 1885 the Nuevo León Baptist Association was organized in Monterrey.

After the turn of the century, Alejandro Treviño, John Cheavens and James Chastain proposed the idea of organizing a national convention. Forty-three church messengers met at the Primera Iglesia Bautista (First Baptist Church) in Mexico City in September 1903. From this gathering came a provisional constitution for the National Convention, and the groundwork for missionary, theological and publications ministries. This began a transition of the work from leadership by foreign missionaries to leadership by national pastors. In 1904, the National Convention selected Alejandro Treviño to represent them at the first Baptist World Congress, from which was formed the Baptist World Alliance.

In 1993, the Convention was able to gain official recognition through registration with the Office of Religious Affairs.

According to a census published by the association in 2023, it claimed 1,800 churches and 90,000 members.

== La Luz Bautista ==
La Luz Bautista (The Baptist Light) is the official periodical of the Convention.

== Schools ==
It has 2 affiliated theological institutes, the Mexican Baptist Theological Seminary in Naucalpan de Juárez and the Dr. Cosme G. Montemayor Baptist Theological Seminary in Matamoros.

== Health Services ==
The convention has 2 hospitals, gathered in the Hospital México Americano network.

== See also ==
- Bible
- Born again
- Baptist beliefs
- Jesus Christ
- Believers' Church

== Sources ==
- Baptists Around the World, by Albert W. Wardin, Jr.
