= Union of Baptist Churches of Cameroon =

Christian denomination in Cameroon

- Union des Églises Baptistes du Cameroun
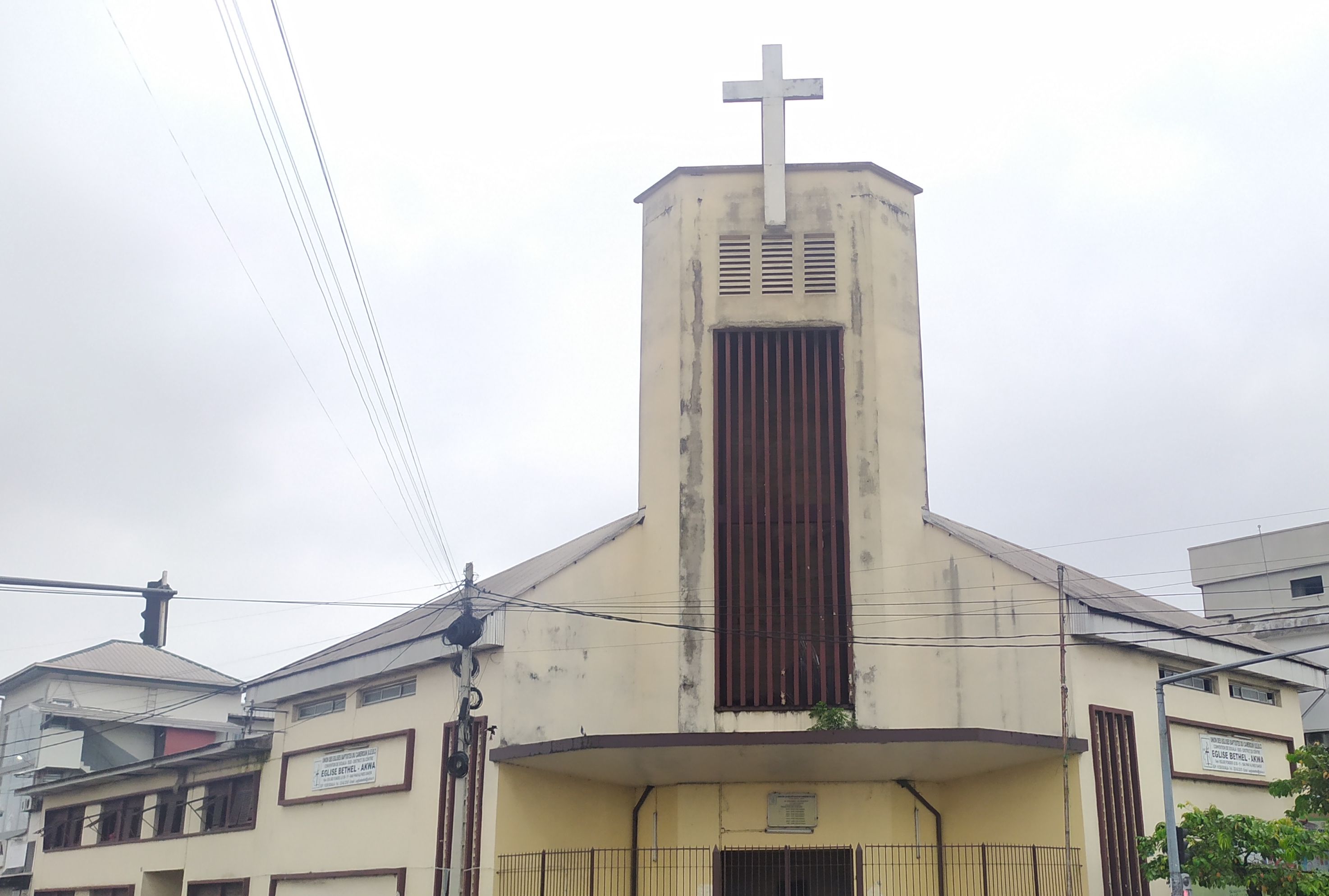
- UEBC church in Douala
- Abbreviation: UEBC
- Classification: Evangelical Christianity
- Theology: Baptist
- Associations: Baptist World Alliance; World Council of Churches
- Headquarters: Douala, Cameroon
- Origin: 1952
- Congregations: 525
- Members: 80,000
- Hospitals: 4
- Primary schools: 19
- Secondary schools: 3
- Seminaries: 2
- Official website: uebcameroun.org

The Union of Baptist Churches of Cameroon (French: Union des Églises Baptistes du Cameroun) is a Baptist Christian denomination in Cameroon. It is affiliated with the Baptist World Alliance. The headquarters is in Douala.

== History ==
The Union has its origins in a British mission of the Baptist Missionary Society in Bimbia in 1843, led by the Jamaican missionary Joseph Merrick. In 1845, the English missionary Alfred Saker and his wife arrived in Douala. In 1849, Saker founded Bethel Baptist Church. In 1886, after the expulsion of the Baptist Missionary Society by the Germans, mission work was transferred to the Basel Mission. In 1917, the administration of the mission was taken over by the Paris Evangelical Missionary Society. In 1931, the mission was taken over by the North American Baptist Conference. In 1952, the Union of Baptist Churches of Cameroon was formally founded. In 1957, it became autonomous of the Paris Evangelical Missionary Society. According to a census published by the association in 2023, it claimed 525 churches and 80,000 members.

== Schools ==
It has 19 primary schools, 3 secondary schools.

It also has 4 professional training institutes.

It has 2 affiliated theological institutes.

== Health Services ==
It has 4 hospitals and 16 health centers.

== See also ==
- World Evangelical Alliance
- Believers' Church
