= Association of Bible Baptist Churches in Madagascar =

- Association des églises bibliques baptistes de Madagascar
- Classification: Evangelical Christianity
- Theology: Baptist
- Associations: Baptist World Alliance
- Headquarters: Antananarivo, Madagascar
- Origin: 1963
- Congregations: 453
- Members: 10,744
- Official website: batista-biblika.mg

The Association of Bible Baptist Churches in Madagascar (French: Association des églises bibliques baptistes de Madagascar, Malagasy: Fivondronan’ny Fiangonana Batista Biblika eto Madagasikara) is a Baptist Christian denomination, affiliated with the Baptist World Alliance, in Madagascar. The headquarters is in Ankadivato, Antananarivo, Madagascar.

== History ==
The Association of Bible Baptist Churches in Madagascar has its origins in a foreign mission of the London Missionary Society in 1932. The Association was officially formed in 1963. In 2006, it has 55 churches and 3,000 members.

According to a census published by the association in 2023, it claimed 453 churches and 10,744 members.

== Schools ==
It is a partner of the Baptist Biblical Seminary of Madagascar in Antsirabe and the Faculty of Baptist Theology of Madagascar in Antananarivo.

== Hospitals ==
It is a partner of the Bonne Nouvelle Hospital in Mandritsara.

== See also ==
- Bible
- Born again
- Baptist beliefs
- Jesus Christ
- Believers' Church
