= Baptist Community of the Congo River =

Baptist Christian denomination in the DRC

- Communauté Baptiste du Fleuve Congo
- Abbreviation: CBFC
- Classification: Protestant
- Orientation: Baptist
- Theology: Evangelical Baptist
- Associations: Church of Christ in the Congo, Baptist World Alliance
- Headquarters: Kinshasa, Democratic Republic of the Congo
- Origin: 1960
- Congregations: 2,697
- Members: 1,769,444
- Official website: ecc-cbfc.org

The Baptist Community of the Congo River (French: Communauté Baptiste du Fleuve Congo) is a Baptist Christian denomination in Democratic Republic of the Congo. It is affiliated with the Church of Christ in the Congo and the Baptist World Alliance. The headquarters is in Kinshasa.

== History ==
The Baptist Community of the Congo River has its origins in a Baptist mission established along the Congo River, in 1880, by Thomas J. Comber and George Grenfell of the Baptist Missionary Society. In 1960, the Lower River Baptist Church, the Upper Congo Baptist Church and the Middle River Baptist Church joined forces to form the Zaire River Baptist Community. In 2006, the Community had 221 churches and 274,092 members. According to a census published by the association in 2025, it claimed 2,697 churches and 1,769,444 members.

== See also ==
- Bible
- Born again
- Baptist beliefs
- Jesus Christ
- Believers' Church
