= Baptist Union of Croatia =

The Baptist Union of Croatia (Croatian: Savez Baptističkih crkava u Republici Hrvatsko) is a Baptist Christian denomination in Croatia. It is affiliated with the European Baptist Federation and the Baptist World Alliance.

== History ==
The first known Baptist activity in this region occurred in the late 19th century. Filip Lotz, converted and baptized in Vienna, returned home in 1883. A ministry arose among the Germans in Daruvar of Slavonia, and later became a Czech and Croatian work. Ivan Zrinscak started Baptist work in Zagreb about 1890, and being converted while in Budapest. The Croatians formed their union in 1991, when Croatia became independent from Yugoslavia. The Baptist Union of Croatia was officially recognized by the state.

According to a census published by the association in 2023, it claimed 1,800 members and 48 churches.

Ministries include the Theological Faculty, an educational facility in Zagreb started by Baptists and Lutherans in 1976, and the Baptist Institute, started by the Baptist Union in 1999, and Baptist Aid, "established to coordinate the work of various humanitarian organizations".
