= Cayman Baptist Association =

The Cayman Baptist Association is a fellowship of Baptist churches on Cayman Brac.

Baptist work began in the Cayman Islands in 1885, when J. H. Sobey of the Jamaica Baptist Mission Society visited the islands. Four churches were organised on Cayman Brac and one on Little Cayman.
