= Baptist Evangelical Association of Madagascar =

The Baptist Evangelical Association of Madagascar (French: Association évangélique baptiste de Madagascar) is a Baptist Christian denomination churches in Madagascar.

== History ==
Four Malagasy Baptist churches formed the association in 1997. In 2005 four churches were members of the association. Leadership is vested in a board of directors.
