= Kampuchea Christian Council =

Christian council in Cambodia

The Kampuchea Christian Council is a Christian ecumenical organization founded in Cambodia in 1998. It is a member of the World Council of Churches and the Christian Conference of Asia.

== See also ==
- Christianity in Cambodia
