= Baptist Union of Zambia =

Baptist Christian denomination in Zambia

- Classification: Evangelical Christianity
- Theology: Baptist
- Associations: Baptist World Alliance
- Headquarters: Ndola, Zambia
- Origin: 1975
- Congregations: 1,000
- Members: 220,000

The Baptist Union of Zambia is a Baptist Christian denomination in Zambia. It is affiliated with the Baptist World Alliance. The headquarters is in Ndola.

== History ==
The Baptist Union of Zambia has its origins in a South African mission of the Baptist Union of Southern Africa in 1924 It is officially founded in 1975. According to a census published by the association in 2023, it claimed 1,000 churches and 220,000 members.

== See also ==
- Bible
- Born again
- Jesus Christ
- Believers' Church
