= Union of Christian Evangelical Baptist Churches of Moldova =

Christian denomination in Moldova

- Uniunii Bisericilor Creștine Evanghelice Baptiste din Moldova
- Classification: Evangelical Christianity
- Scripture: Bible
- Theology: Baptist
- Polity: Congregationalist
- Associations: European Baptist Federation; Baptist World Alliance
- Region: Moldova
- Headquarters: Chișinău
- Origin: 1920
- Congregations: 482
- Members: 19,578
- Other name: Baptist Union of Moldova
- Official website: ro.baptist.org.md

The Union of Christian Evangelical Baptist Churches of Moldova (Romanian: Uniunii Bisericilor Creștine Evanghelice Baptiste din Moldova) is a Baptist Christian denomination in Moldova. It is affiliated with the European Baptist Federation and the Baptist World Alliance. Its headquarters is in Chișinău.

== History ==
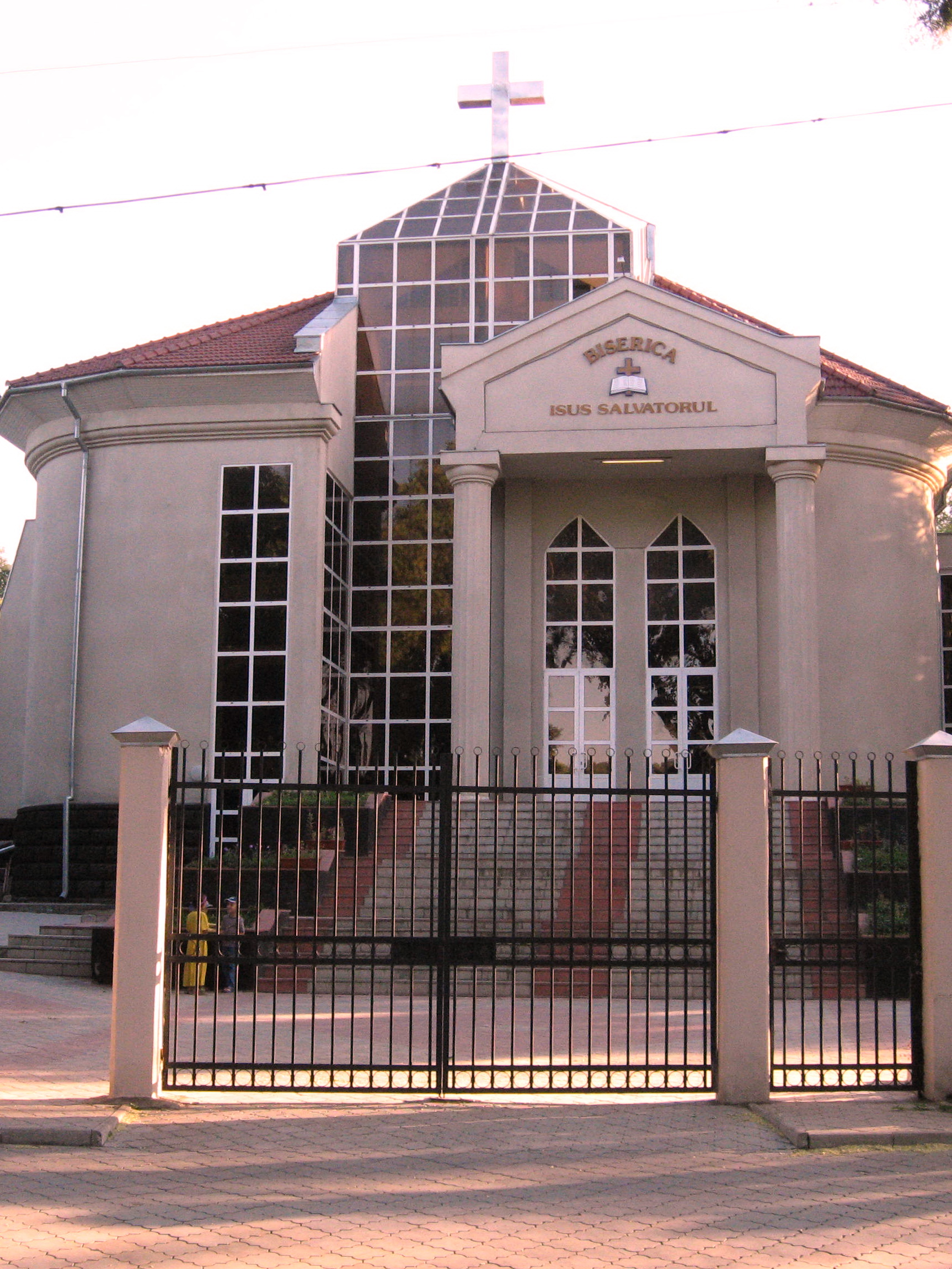
Church of Jesus the Savior in Chișinău

The first Russian congregation was established in Chișinău in 1908. German Baptists formed an association in 1907 and Russian-speaking Baptists formed one in 1920. Under control of the USSR, Baptists and other Christians faced restrictions in their religious activities. The Union was formed in 1992.

According to a census published by the association in 2023, it reported 19,578 members and 482 churches.

== See also ==
- Christianity in Moldova
