= Covenanted Baptist Church of Canada =

The Covenanted Baptist Church of Canada is a small body of Predestinarian Baptists in Canada with Scottish roots.

== History ==
In 1818 Dugald Campbell, of North Knapdale, Scotland emigrated to Canada and settled in Aldborough, Elgin County, Ontario. Campbell was a deacon in Scotland, but upon his arrival soon began preaching.

In 1820, Elder Dugald Campbell and his followers, believing the Regular Baptists of the area had departed from gospel faith and order, withdrew from them and constituted a church in Aldborough, now known as the Particular Covenanted Baptist Church in Canada. Still a small group, they had grown to five churches in the 1850s - Aldborough, Dunwich, Ekfird, Lobo, and Orford. The Covenanted Baptist Church did not fellowship with any other churches in North America, until an elder, Thomas McColl, received some issues of the Signs of the Times, a Primitive Baptist periodical published by Gilbert Beebe of New York City. In 1857 and 1858, McColl invited Primitive Baptists to visit and preach among their churches. The two groups saw they were established on the same faith and order, and began a relationship of fellowship one with another, which continued to the 20th century. The Covenanted Baptists held the doctrine of absolute predestination, and, after Primitive Baptists in the United States suffered division, remained in correspondence with the Absolute Predestinarian Primitive Baptists.
