= Nepal Baptist Church Council =

- Classification: Evangelical Christianity
- Theology: Baptist
- Associations: Baptist World Alliance
- Headquarters: Kathmandu, Nepal
- Origin: 1992
- Congregations: 254
- Members: 22,397
- Seminaries: Nepal Baptist College
- Official website: nbccnepal.org

The Nepal Baptist Church Council is a Baptist Christian denomination in Nepal. It is affiliated with the Baptist World Alliance. The headquarters is in Kathmandu.

== History ==
The Nepal Baptist Church Council has its origins in a British mission of the BMS World Mission and the Council of Baptist Churches in Northeast India in 1962. It is officially founded in 1992. According to a census published by the association in 2023, it claimed 254 churches and 22,397 members.

== Schools ==
It has 1 affiliated theological institute, the Nepal Baptist College in Kathmandu founded in 1998.
