= Native Baptist Church of Cameroon =

Christian denomination in Cameroon

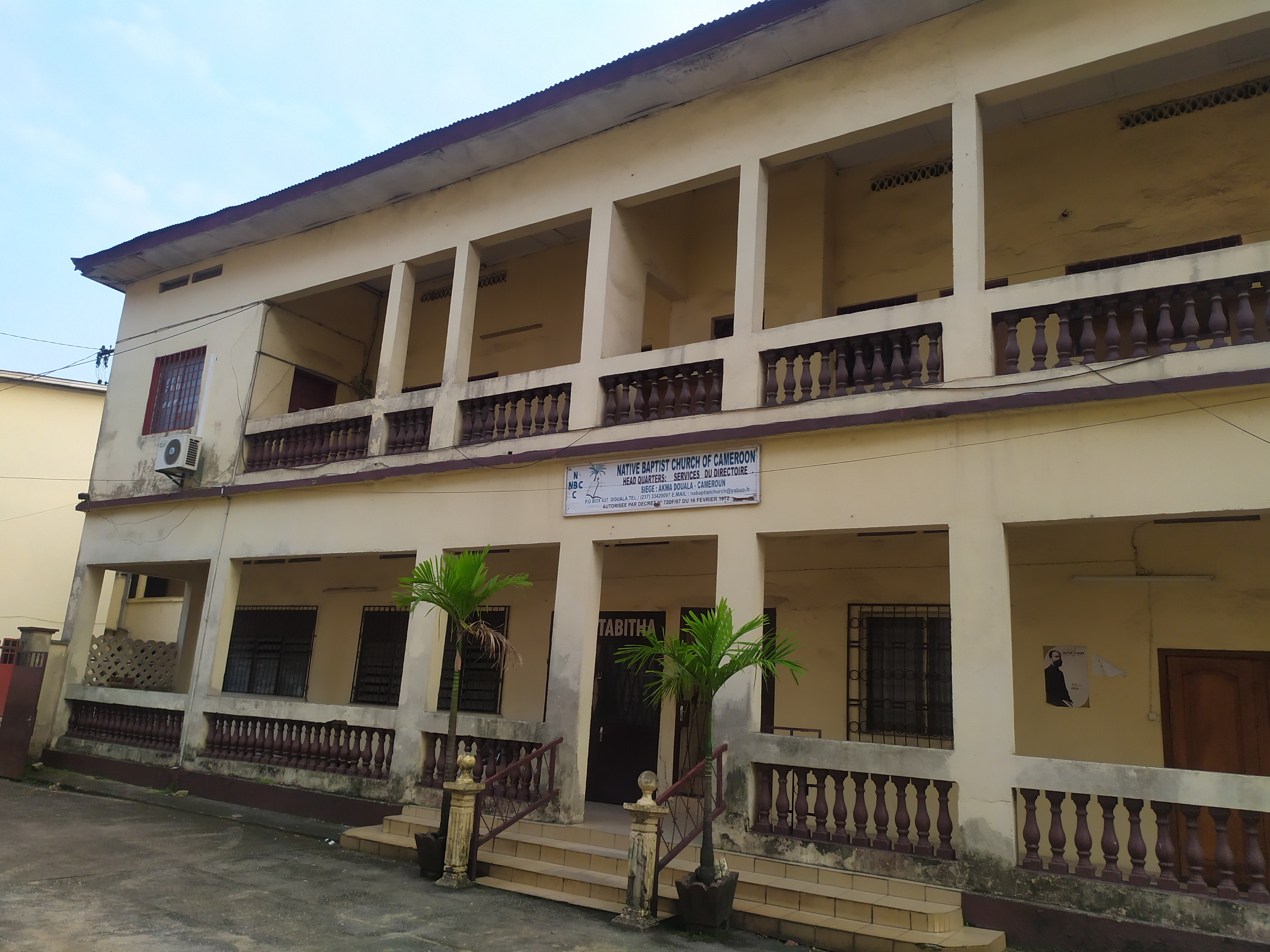
- Headquarters in Douala
- Abbreviation: NBC
- Classification: Evangelical Christianity
- Theology: Baptist
- Associations: Baptist World Alliance
- Headquarters: Douala, Cameroon
- Origin: 1888
- Congregations: 135
- Members: 16,000

The Native Baptist Church of Cameroon is a Baptist Christian denomination in Cameroon. It is affiliated with the Baptist World Alliance. The headquarters is in Douala.

== History ==
The Union has its origins in a British mission of the Baptist Missionary Society in Bimbia in 1843, led by the Jamaican missionary Joseph Merrick. In 1845, the English missionary Alfred Saker and his wife arrived in Douala. In 1849, Saker founded Bethel Baptist Church.

In 1886, two years after the signing of the treaty between the Germans and the Duala, when the German authorities expelled the Baptist Missionary Society and transferred its work to the Basel Mission, the Native Baptist Church congregation led by Reverend Joshua Dibundu Dibue protested vigorously and stood up for their self-governing.

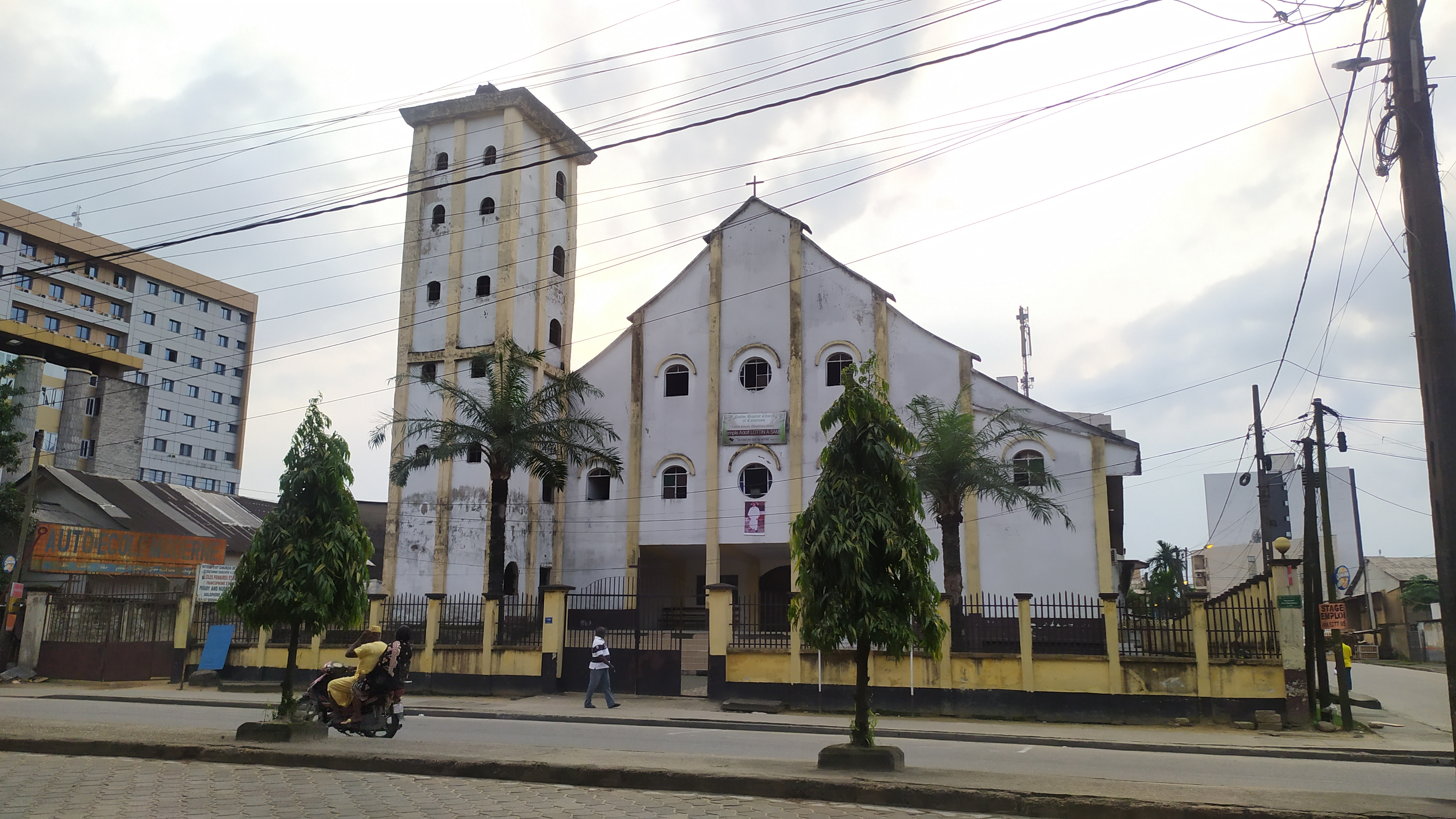
Ebenezer Baptist Church Akwa, in Douala

It was officially founded in Douala in 1888 as the Native Baptist Church.

In 1917, under French rule the Native Baptist Church was again opposed to the authority of the Paris Evangelical Missionary Society (Société des Missions Evangéliques de Paris).

In 1921, Pastor Adolph Lotin Same became president of the Native Baptist Church. Because of his speech on the autonomy of the leadership of Baptist churches vis-à-vis the European missionaries of the Society of Evangelical Missions of Paris, the missionaries excluded him from the function of pastor in 1922. The French authorities also decided to close the Native Baptist Churches that same year. Lotin must thus preach in secret. In 1929, Lotin founded a pressure group aimed at authorizing NBC. In 1932, the Church was authorized again. Suspected of campaigning for the return of the Germans by the French authorities, he was imprisoned in 1940 and released in 1941. Generally considered to be the first nationalist leader of the French colonial era, this music composer wrote more than 400 hymns.

In 1949, it became autonomous of the Paris Evangelical Missionary Society.

In 1969, the Church formed the NBC/EBC association with the Église Baptiste Camerounaise (EBC), a French-speaking union. In 1972, the French-speaking partners legally registered the association under the name Église Baptiste Camerounaise, instead of NBC/EBC. In January 2009, the English speakers of the Native Baptist Church ended the alliance with the Église Baptiste Camerounaise due to the absence of projects in the English-speaking part as well as the non-use of English in the affairs of the union.

According to a census published by the association in 2023, it claimed 135 churches and 16,000 members.
