= Baptist Convention of Namibia =

- Classification: Evangelical Christianity
- Theology: Baptist
- Associations: Baptist World Alliance
- Headquarters: Windhoek, Namibia
- Origin: 1984
- Congregations: 70
- Members: 13,528

The Baptist Convention of Namibia is a Baptist Christian denomination in Namibia. It is affiliated with the Baptist World Alliance. The headquarters is in Windhoek.

== History ==
The Baptist Convention of Namibia has its origins in a South African mission of the Baptist Union of Southern Africa in 1961. It is officially founded in 1984. According to a census published by the association in 2023, it claimed 70 churches and 13,528 members.
