= Liberia Baptist Missionary and Educational Convention =

- Abbreviation: LBMEC
- Classification: Evangelical Christianity
- Theology: Baptist
- Associations: Baptist World Alliance
- Headquarters: Monrovia, Liberia
- Origin: 1880
- Congregations: 292
- Members: 55,325
- Tertiary institutions: William R. Tolbert Baptist University
- Seminaries: Liberia Baptist Theological Seminary
- Official website: lbmec.org

The Liberia Baptist Missionary and Educational Convention is a Baptist Christian denomination in Liberia. It is affiliated with the Baptist World Alliance. The headquarters is in Monrovia.

== History ==
The Liberia Baptist Missionary and Educational Convention has its origins in an American mission of the Richmond African Baptist Missionary Society in 1821. It is officially founded in 1880. According to a census published by the association in 2023, it claimed 292 churches and 55,325 members.

== Schools ==
It founded the Liberia Baptist Theological Seminary in Monrovia in 1976.

It founded William R. Tolbert Baptist University in Krukai in 2022.
