= Baptist Convention of Eastern Cuba =

Baptist Christian denomination in Cuba

- Convención Bautista de Cuba Oriental
- Classification: Evangelical Christianity
- Theology: Baptist
- Associations: Baptist World Alliance
- Headquarters: Santiago de Cuba, Cuba
- Origin: 1905
- Congregations: 672
- Members: 43,506
- Official website: cbcor.org

The Baptist Convention of Eastern Cuba (Spanish: Convención Bautista de Cuba Oriental) is a Baptist Christian denomination in Cuba. It is affiliated with the Baptist World Alliance. The headquarters is in Santiago de Cuba.

== History ==
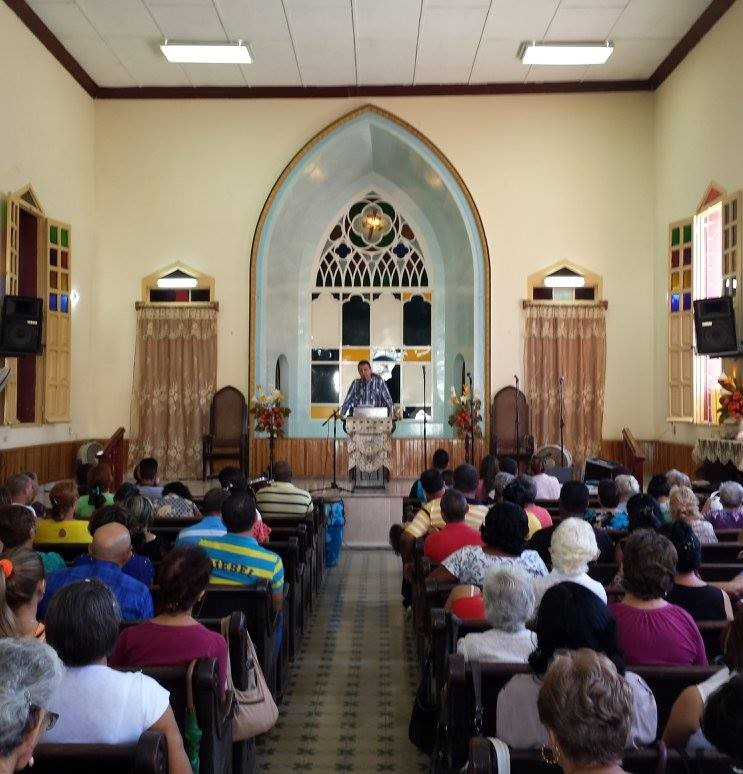
Worship service at First Baptist Church Eben-Ezer in Manzanillo, Cuba.

The Baptist Convention of Eastern Cuba has its origins in a mission of the American Baptist International Ministries in Santiago de Cuba in 1899. It is officially founded in 1905. According to a census published by the association in 2023, it claimed 672 churches and 43,506 members.

== See also ==
- Bible
- Born again
- Baptist beliefs
- Jesus Christ
- Believers' Church
