= Thailand Karen Baptist Convention =

- Classification: Evangelical Christianity
- Theology: Baptist
- Associations: Baptist World Alliance
- Headquarters: Chiang Mai, Thailand
- Origin: 1955
- Congregations: 225
- Members: 41,566
- Seminaries: Siloam Bible Institute
- Official website: karen-tkbc.com

The Thailand Karen Baptist Convention is a Baptist Christian denomination in Thailand. It is affiliated with the Baptist World Alliance. The headquarters is in Chiang Mai.

== History ==
The Thailand Karen Baptist Convention has its origins in a mission of the American Baptist International Ministries in 1833. It is officially founded in 1955. According to a census published by the association in 2023, it claimed 225 churches and 41,566 members.

== Schools ==
It has 1 affiliated theological institute, the Siloam Bible Institute in Chiang Mai founded in 1953
