= Bangladesh Baptist Church Sangha =

Baptist Christian denomination in Bangladesh

- Classification: Evangelical Christianity
- Theology: Baptist
- Associations: Asia Pacific Baptist Federation, Baptist World Alliance
- Headquarters: Dhaka, Bangladesh
- Origin: 1935
- Congregations: 390
- Members: 26,998
- Hospitals: 2
- Primary schools: 64
- Secondary schools: 3
- Seminaries: Baptist Theology Academy
- Official website: bbcs.org.bd

The Bangladesh Baptist Church Sangha is a Baptist Christian denomination in Bangladesh. It is affiliated with the Baptist World Alliance. The headquarters is in Dhaka.

== History ==
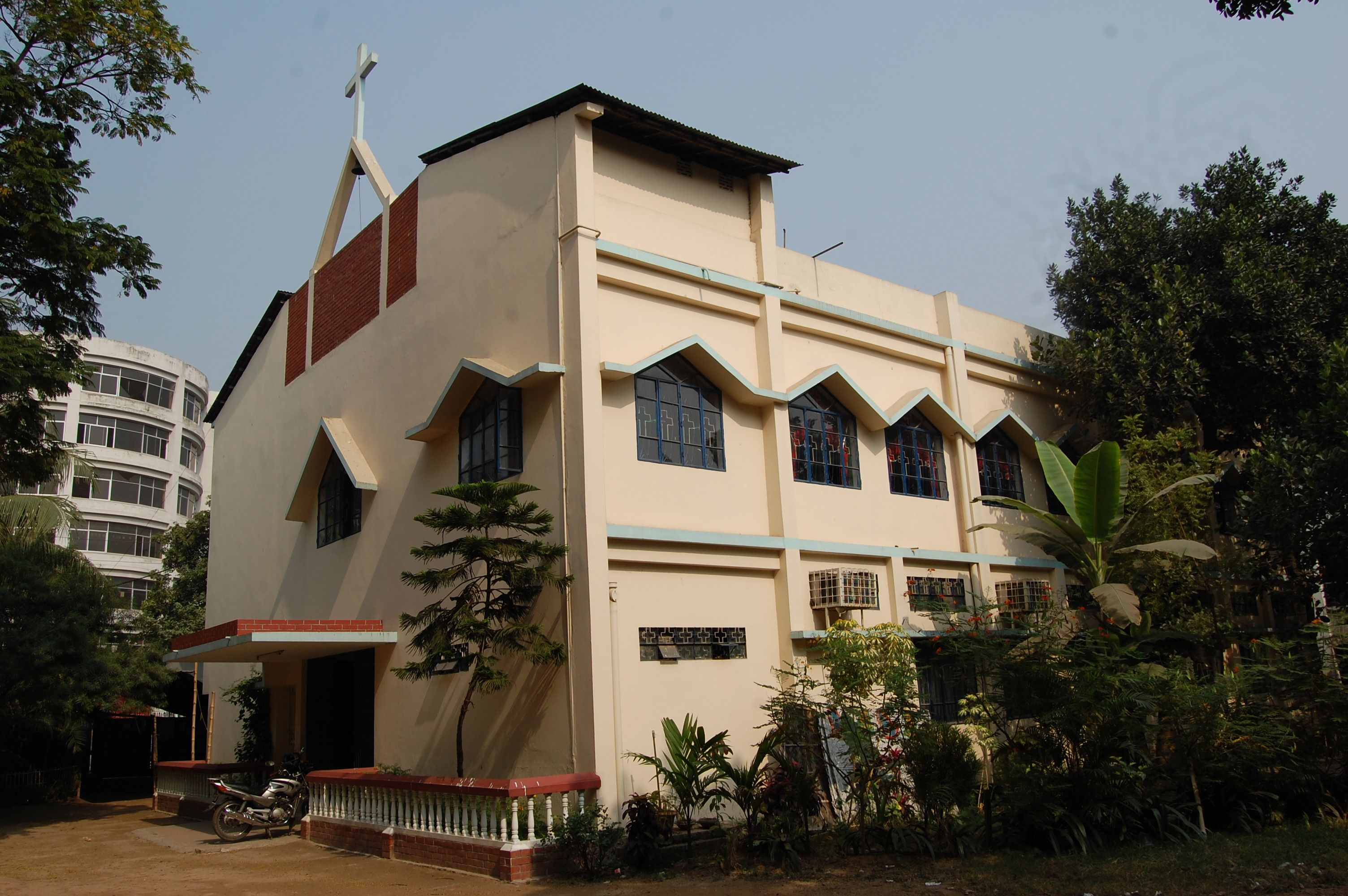
Church Headquarters in Dhaka.

The Bangladesh Baptist Church Sangha has its origins in a British mission of the BMS World Mission in 1793. It was officially founded in 1935 as the Bengal Baptist Union. In 2001, it takes the name of Bangladesh Baptist Church Sangha. According to a census published by the association in 2023, it claimed 390 churches and 26,998 members.

== Contributions ==
One of the major contributions by the early Baptists missionaries to the development of modern Bengal in the area of linguistics and educational work. This included the development of a Bengali dictionary and grammar, the first translation of the Bible in Bengali as well as the publication Digdarshan and Samachar Darpan, periodicals that represent the beginnings of the Bengali press. They also co-founded the Calcutta School Book Society in 1817 which published thousands of textbooks in modern science, geography and history for the first time in Bengali.

== Schools ==
The convention has 64 primary schools, 3 secondary schools.

It has 1 affiliated theological institute, the Baptist Theology Academy in Dhaka.

== Health Services ==
The convention has 2 hospitals, Christian Hospital Chandraghona, and 3 health centers.

== Affiliations ==
The BBS participates actively in ecumenical relationships through:

- National Council of Churches – Bangladesh
  - Christian Conference of Asia
  - World Council of Churches
- Baptist World Alliance
  - Asia Pacific Baptist Federation

== See also ==
- Bible
- Born again
- Jesus Christ
- Believers' Church
