= Baptist Convention of Western Cuba =

- Convención Bautista de Cuba Occidental
- Classification: Evangelical Christianity
- Theology: Baptist
- Associations: Baptist World Alliance
- Headquarters: Havana, Cuba
- Origin: 1905
- Congregations: 561
- Members: 28,022
- Official website: acbcocc.org

The Baptist Convention of Western Cuba (Spanish: Convención Bautista de Cuba Occidental) is a Baptist Christian denomination in Cuba. It is affiliated with the Baptist World Alliance. The headquarters is in Havana.

== History ==
The Baptist Convention of Western Cuba has its origins in an American mission of the International Mission Board in 1898. It is officially founded in 1905. According to a census published by the association in 2023, it claimed 561 churches and 28,022 members.

== See also ==
- Bible
- Born again
- Baptist beliefs
- Jesus Christ
- Believers' Church
