= European Baptist Federation =

Federation of Baptist associations

- Abbreviation: EBF
- Classification: Evangelical Christianity
- Theology: Baptist
- Associations: Baptist World Alliance
- Region: 52 countries
- Headquarters: Amsterdam, Netherlands
- Origin: 1964
- Congregations: 24,000
- Members: 800,000
- Missionary organization: EBM international
- Official website: www.ebf.org

The European Baptist Federation (EBF) is a federation of 59 Baptist associations and is one of six regional fellowships in the Baptist World Alliance. The headquarters is in Amsterdam, Netherlands.

== History ==
The EBF was founded in Ruschlikon, Switzerland, in 1949. That same year, it participated in the founding of the International Baptist Theological Study Centre in Ruschlikon, Switzerland. In 1993, Birgit Elisabet Karlsson was the first woman pastor to become President of the EBF.

It lays a great deal of emphasis on human rights, religious liberty and aid programs. According to a census published by the association in 2023, it claimed 59 member associations in 52 countries, 24,000 churches and 800,000 members.

== See also ==
- Bible
- Born again
- Baptist beliefs
- List of Baptist confessions
- List of Baptist World Alliance National Fellowships
- Jesus Christ
- Believers' Church
