= Paris Evangelical Missionary Society =

1822–1970 French Reformed Church missionary association

The Paris Evangelical Missionary Society (in French, Société des missions évangéliques de Paris), also known as the SMEP or Mission de Paris, was a Protestant missionary association created in 1822. As with other Christian societies of the era, it came under of the auspices of an organised church, in this case the Reformed Church in France and brought together Protestants of the Réveil (Awakening).

The SMEP opened several areas of operation, notably in Africa (in particular, Lesotho) and Oceania. The churches founded in these areas were organised along similar lines to the Reformed Church in France, with synods and presbyteries (consistoires)

== Headquarters of the Missionary Society ==
Before 1887, the Paris Evangelical Missionary Society did not own its own building. To house about ten people at the time (the director and his family, and the student missionaries), the Missionary Society moved five times in 50 years: Boulevard du Montparnasse (in 1823), Rue de Clichy (in 1833), Rue de Berlin (in 1841), and Rue Franklin in Passy (in 1856). Finally, in 1873, it moved to Rue des Fossés Saint-Jacques, to be closer to the university district.

In 1885, Dr. Gustave Monod, vice president of the Society's Steering Committee, proposed the construction of what would become the Society's Parisian headquarters, the "white house." The director of the Missionary Society, Alfred Boegner, anticipated a significant expansion of missionary work, with the number of mission fields increasing from four to seven. It is therefore particularly relevant to establish a real base, like Protestant mission societies in other countries.

== Areas of Operation ==
The SMEP opened numerous mission fields, notably in Africa (Lesotho, Zambia, Gabon, Cameroon, Togo, Congo-Brazzaville, Casceaman (Senegal), Kabylia), in the Indian Ocean (Madagascar), and in Oceania (New Caledonia, French Polynesia). Its missionaries established churches and selected local elders. During the Second Empire, a mission was briefly conducted in China.

In 1890, the mission in Lesotho comprised 128 evangelization stations, 81 missionary pastors, 57 European teachers, and 103 local teachers. It maintained 129 primary schools, a teacher training college, a girls' high school, an industrial school, a Bible school, a theological school, and published a monthly magazine, *La petite lumière du Lessouto* (The Little Light of Lesotho). It has an impact on a community of approximately 50,000 people.

== Attitude towards slavery ==
The Evangelical Missionary Society was particularly sensitive to the problems of slavery (which would not be abolished in France until 1848).

Very quickly, a specific organization independent of the Missionary Society, the organization for fugitive slaves in Saint-Louis, Senegal, was founded, with the aim of “rescuing and evangelizing slaves who, mistreated at home, take refuge in Senegal to escape the barbaric treatment of their owners; selecting from among these fugitives the most willing and intelligent young men to raise in France and making them skilled artisans, teachers, and, if God calls them, missionaries, so that one day Senegal, this land so inhospitable to Europeans, may be evangelized by its own children” (according to the Dictionary of Protestant Works published in 1889).

In 1964, the daughter churches established by SMEP missionaries expressed a strong desire to change the tenor of the relationship with the mother church, for their part they wished for 'integration of the Missionary Church to the Mother Church' (l'intégration de la Mission à l'Église) This objective was realised in 1970, when two new organizations replaced the SMEP:

- CÉVAA Communauté évangélique d'action apostolique (subsequently Communauté d'Églises en Mission), a federation of sister churches consisting of five Lutheran and reformed churches from France, Italy, Switzerland and those churches with their origins in the missionary work of SMEP
- DÉFAP, Département évangélique français d'action apostolique (subsequently Service protestant de mission), a common missionary service for the five churches of the CÉVAA, with its headquarters at Maison des Missions 102, boulevard Arago, 75014 Paris, (former seat of the Paris Evangelical Missionary Society). DÉFAP continues to publish the monthly magazine Mission, the Journal des missions évangéliques, the SMEP.

== Bibliography ==
- Jean-François Zorn, Le grand siècle d’une mission protestante : la Mission de Paris, 1822-1914, Paris, Karthala, 1993, 791 p. (épuisé, en cours de ré-édition)
- Jeanne-Marie Léonard, Mémoires d’évangile : les archives de la Société des missions évangéliques de Paris, 1822-1949, Paris, Défap, 2000, 51-XXII p.

== See also ==
- Reformed Church in France
- Huguenot
