= Baptist Conference of the Philippines =

Philippine Religious Conference

The Baptist Conference of the Philippines is a Baptist Christian denomination in the Philippines. It is affiliated with the Baptist World Alliance.

Its headquarters is 910 A.S. Fortuna St., Banilad, Mandaue, Cebu 6014.

== History ==
Work began in 1949 with five Baptist General Conference missionaries in Cebu. In June 1950, the Baptist General Conference (BGC) Foreign Mission Board declared Northern Cebu as the area where the BGC missionary work was to begin. BCP is the direct result of the mission endeavor of the Baptist General Conference in the United States. Agnes Erikson was the first BGC missionary to the Philippines, sailing from San Francisco, California on 9 December 1948. A year later, two missionary families headed by Andrew Nelson and Irwin Bjelland followed, sailing from San Francisco on 30 October 1949 and arriving in Manila on 20 November 1949.

Initial results of their work are as follows: "At the end of February 1950, Andrew Nelson reported 5 services were being conducted on Sundays near Bogo, while Irwin Bjelland reported on May 7, 1950 letter, the first Sunday service had been held." Another group was organized in the town of Catmon marked by k.m 57. The place was situated between Cebu City and Bogo. The couples Eufrosino Ares and Paterna Comain became language teachers who could speak English very well. They assisted the Hughs, Osbrons, Chesbro's and later the Chalmers family who actually lived in the place. Mr. Ares became the first chairman of the newly formed school board of Baptist Bible School tasked to help manage the 24 hec. property for the school site situated in the northern end of Cebu. Although, he did not become a pastor upon invitation due to the large family he had to support, he became involved through his profession as a teacher and his farming skills in the conception of the early missionary endeavour."

The concrete result of the mission work occurred in June 1952, when the first baptismal service was held. B-Etta Mayer gave this report of the event: "The six candidates included a promising preacher and his sister. On the shore were jeering mocking, scornful friends, relatives and casual observers." Of these six, two now are still in active service: Rev. Cresenciano Batuto, Pastor Emeritus of Grace Baptist Church of Gigatangan in Naval, Biliran; and Mrs. Jacinta Batuto Sarcos, the widow of BTC President Rev. Eliseo Sarcos.

In 1954, there were small Baptist churches in Bogo with 54 baptised members, and on 6 June 1954 the three churches entered into fellowship as the Cebu Baptist Association (CBA). In 1965, the CBA constitution was amended, renaming the body to Baptist Conference of the Philippines (BCP). The change was driven by fact that mission work had expanded beyond Cebu island, as churches and mission points have already been established in neighbouring provinces in the Visayas.

The creation of the BCP concretised the identity of a national organisation, which developed from a simple organization into a more complex entity. As the BCP grew in number of churches and members, its area of ministry widened. Leaders too in local churches, districts and the national organization developed. This necessitated a clarification of role in its relationship with the "mother organization", the BGCPM, resulting in a series of consultations, which gave birth to a partnership.

BGCPM and BCP now became partners in working together to accomplish God's purposes. The ultimate goal is always a strong and self-propagating family of Baptist churches. Rev. Marwin Linstedt wrote: "This partnership, however, is constantly updated. Times change. So do people. The original leadership gives way to next generation. The strategies of the 1950s and 1960s serve their purposes and yield to approaches that are more relevant to the 1970s and 1980s. The Philippines is a rapidly urbanizing society. During the nearly forty years covered in this story, the population of the country more than triples. Old values give way to new ones. An entirely new generation of Filipinos moves into leadership in the nation and in the churches."

According to a census published by the association in 2023, it claimed 35,000 members and 430 churches.

== The BCP and the Mission-in-Dialogue ==
"At the end of the decade of the 1960s drew nearer, the need to evaluate the relationship between the BCP and the BGC mission became obvious to all concerned. The BCP would be making its 15th anniversary in 1969. During that year the mission would be 20 years old. By and large, both bodies had been working harmoniously over these years. However, strains and misunderstanding were beginning to appear. In a way this was to be expected. The relationship of the BCP leadership to the missionaries was cross-cultural in nature. In the formative stages of the work, the mission had naturally played a leading role, and the Filipino leadership was willing to cooperate and learn. Most of the pastors and BCP trustees had worked closely with the missionaries, and had been well trained at BTC. The ways and ideas of the missionaries were well known to them, not only strengths but also their weaknesses."

The emerging leadership of the BCP feeling that it was time to do so strongly exerted its right to be heard. This resulted in a series of consultation, resulting in the creation of the Joint Work Program (JWP).

"The JWP was designed to be a mechanism of coordination and administration for the common ministries of the BCP and the BGCPM. The general goals were started to be:

1. Communicating the Gospel to as many as possible
2. Winning souls to Jesus Christ
3. Establishing local churches
4. Strengthening existing churches
5. Training Christians for leadership on all levels
6. Developing a strong and growing BCP

=== Five areas of cooperating ministry were agreed upon ===
1. Evangelism and church planting
2. Administration of JWP budget; revolving funds and church grant funds
3. Catechism
4. Publishing and distributing Christian literature and;
5. The Baptist Theological College

The JWP was originally designed to be a 15-year program in three phases leading to a fully self-sustaining, self-propagating, and missions minded BCP: Phase 1 – was to last for 5 years, concentrating on promoting church growth Phase 2 – was to last for 7 years. The emphasis was to train and expand BCP leadership together with continuing growth. Phase 3 – was to last 3 years, which BCP leadership would be consolidated in preparation for withdrawal of the BGC Mission participation on the board.

"In actual practice, the JWP was in effect only in 1971 to 1977. By 1976, the Joint Policy Council had concluded that Phase 2 and Phase 3 were not necessary as programmed (We need to implement Phase 2 and 3). BCP was growing rapidly and capable leaders were available. The probability that it had passed was considered to be excellent. On the negative side, the administrative machinery of the JWP was cumbersome and time consuming for those served on the boards. A simpler and more flexible working relationship was needed.

In March 1977, a draft of the general agreement between the Baptist Conference of the Philippines and the Baptist General Conference Philippine Mission was ready for the study and action of the two organizations. In essence, this agreement laid down the guidelines by which the BCP and the Mission would "cooperate and work together for the attainment of the purposes, goals and objectives of the BCP as stated in its constitutions." The duration of the agreement came to be known throughout the BCP as "Ten Year Agreement".

The Ten Year Agreement was replaced by the BGC-BGCPM new agreement of 1986. This was approved during the 29th Annual Conference (Fourth Biennial Assembly) held at First Baptist Church, Cebu City on April 15–18, 1986. The new agreement of 1986 featured for the first time all Filipino Board composed of 11 members, 8 of them representing each BCP district. Three were chosen at large. As of 2002 up to the present BCP has a total of 12 districts.

== Programs ==
=== Church Planting Program ===
The partnership between the BCP and the BGCPM resulted in the formulation of church planting strategies in order to reach the common goals of both organizations. The first church planting program launched was the . . .

=== "Objective Ten Thousand" ===
This program visioned a goal of 10,000 members BCP wide, from a base of 3,500 members on December 31, 1980 to December 1985. Record shows that BCP fall short of its goal; however, during this 5-year period 3,859 new members were added while the number of churches reached 126 congregations.

=== "Double In Four" ===
This program had a goal of doubling the number of churches in four years time, beginning in 1986 to 1990. Under the all-Filipino leadership, it was not able to take off due to non-functioning of its chairman. Handicapped by the lack of functioning ministries, the program was still implemented through the initiative of local churches, the districts and the national office through the BOT.

=== "Operation 4-4-4" ===
This program targets 400 churches in 4 years from 1990 to 1994. This program never took off due to lack of financial resources and personnel in order to implement the program.

Some BCP churches are now involved in cross-cultural missions by sending and supporting 40 missionaries to 12 countries. After 50 years of BCP ministry the era has come for BCP to become a missionary sending denomination instead of being a missionary receiving denomination.

"Decade of Change" BCP is aggressively implementing a church planting movement to reach out the middle class of the Philippine society from 2007 to 2014 with the goal to plant 60 churches.
