= Baptist Church of Hungary =

Baptist denomination in Hungary

- Magyarországi Baptista Egyház
- Classification: Evangelical Christianity
- Theology: Baptist
- Associations: Baptist World Alliance
- Headquarters: Budapest, Hungary
- Origin: 1920
- Congregations: 290
- Members: 11,208
- Official website: baptist.hu

The Baptist Church of Hungary (Hungarian: Magyarországi Baptista Egyház) is a Baptist Christian denomination in Hungary. It is affiliated with the Baptist World Alliance. The headquarters is in Budapest.

== History ==
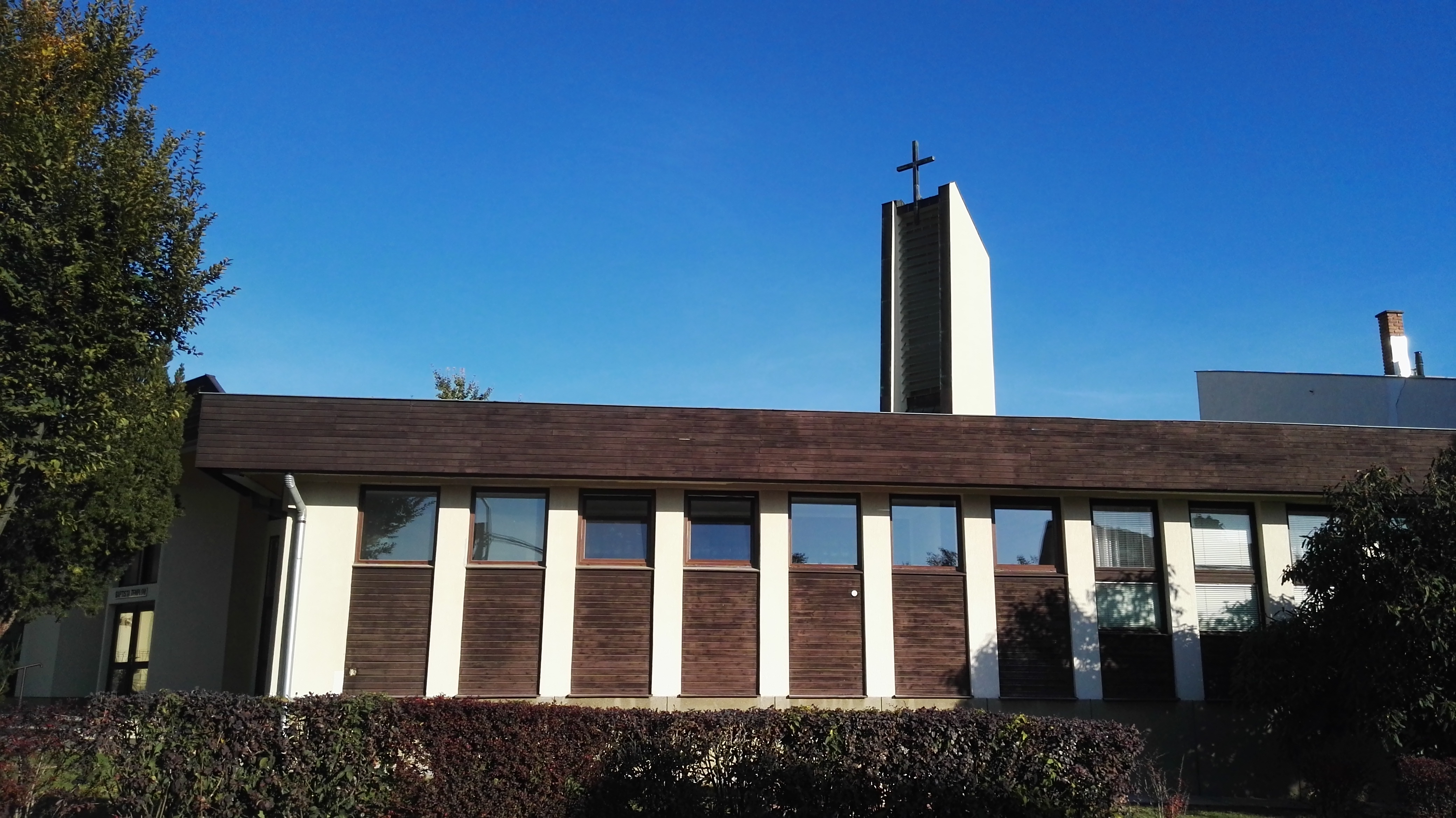
Pécs Baptist Church.

The Baptist Church of Hungary has its origins in the first Baptist church in Budapest founded by the German missionary Heinrich Meyer of the British and Foreign Bible Society in 1874. In 1900, the Baptist Union of Hungary was founded. In 1920, a group of churches broke away from the Baptist Union of Hungary to form the Baptist Church of Hungary. According to a census published by the association in 2023, it claimed 290 churches and 11,208 members.
