= Baptist Convention of Panama =

- Convención Bautista de Panamá
- Classification: Evangelical Christianity
- Theology: Baptist
- Associations: Baptist World Alliance
- Headquarters: Burunga, Panama
- Origin: 1959
- Congregations: 117
- Members: 4,800
- Seminaries: Panama Baptist Theological Seminary
- Official website: cbpanama.org

The Baptist Convention of Panama (Spanish: Convención Bautista de Panamá) is a Baptist Christian denomination in Panama. It is affiliated with the Baptist World Alliance. The headquarters is in Burunga.

== History ==
The Baptist Convention of Panama has its origins in an American mission of the International Mission Board in 1905. It is officially founded in 1959. According to a census published by the association in 2023, it claimed 117 churches and 4,800 members.

== Schools ==
In 1955, it founded the Panama Baptist Theological Seminary.
