= Union of Baptists in Belgium =

- Union des Baptistes en Belgique
- Classification: Evangelical Christianity
- Theology: Baptist
- Associations: Baptist World Alliance
- Origin: 1922
- Congregations: 31
- Members: 1,505
- Official website: ubb.be

The Union of Baptists in Belgium (French: Union des Baptistes en Belgique) is a Baptist Christian denomination in Belgium. It is affiliated with the Baptist World Alliance.

== History ==
The union has its origins in a French Baptist mission in Ougrée in 1895. It was officially founded in 1922. According to a census published by the association in 2020, it claimed 31 churches and 1,505 members.
