= Baptist beliefs =

Beliefs of Baptist Christians

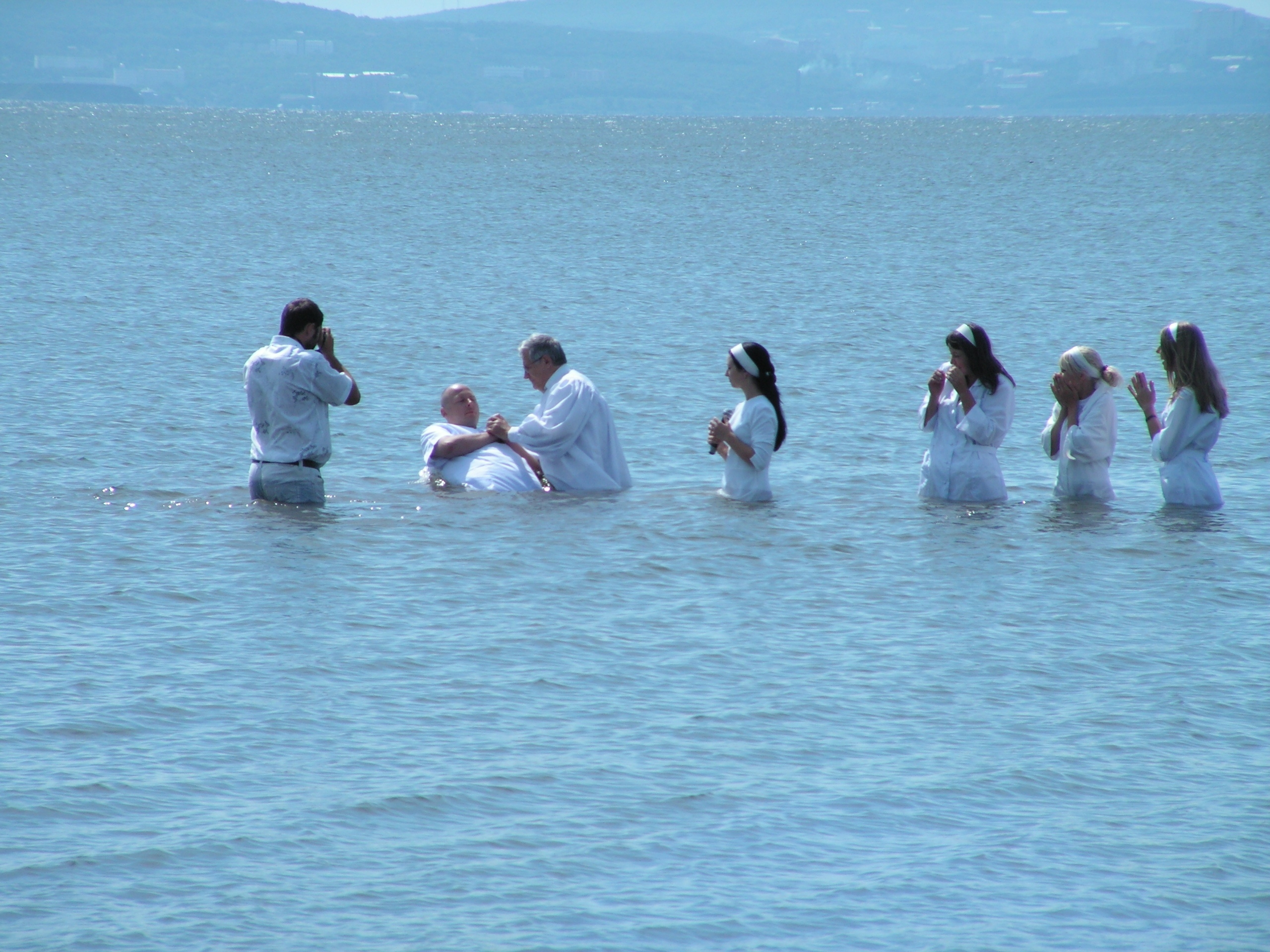
A baptism performed by the Baptist Church of "Open Hearts" in Vladivostok, Russia in August 2008

Baptist beliefs are not completely consistent from one church to another, as Baptists do not have a central governing authority. However, Baptists do hold some common beliefs among almost all Baptist churches.

Since the early days of the Baptist movement, various organizations have adopted common confessions of faith as the basis for cooperative interdependency among local churches. These would include beliefs about one God, the virgin birth, the impeccability, miracles, vicarious atoning death, burial and bodily resurrection of Christ, the need for salvation (although the understanding of means for achieving it may differ at times), divine grace, the Church, the Kingdom of God, last things (Jesus Christ will return personally and visibly in glory to the earth; the dead will be raised; and Christ will judge everyone in righteousness), evangelism and missions.

Baptist beliefs are seen as belonging to the two historical strands: General Baptists (Freewill Baptists), who uphold an Arminian soteriology, and Particular Baptists (Reformed Baptists), who uphold Calvinist soteriology. The 1689 Baptist Confession of Faith is subscribed to by a consensus of Particular Baptists, whereas the Orthodox Creed is widely accepted by General Baptists. A third, recent strand called Independent Baptists, might embrace a strict version of either Arminianism or Calvinism, but are most notable for their fundamental positions on Biblical hermeneutics, family and the social order, and advocacy of "King James Onlyism." In addition to the distinctive doctrines of Protestantism, Baptists reject the theological validity and covenantal value of paedobaptism. While certain Independent Baptists adhere to memorialism, the General Baptists and Reformed Baptists teach the real spiritual presence of Christ in the Eucharist.

== Overview ==
The following acrostic acronym, spelling BAPTIST, summarizes Baptists' distinguishing beliefs:

- Biblical authority (Matt 24:35; 1Pet 1:23; 2Tim 3:16–3:17)
- Autonomy of the local church (Matt 18:15–18:17; 1Cor 6:1–6:3)
- Priesthood of all believers (1Pet 2:5–2:9; 1Tim 2:5)
- Two ordinances (believer's baptism and the Lord's Supper) (Acts 2:41–2:47; 1Cor 11:23–11:32)
- Individual soul liberty (Rom 14:5–14:12)
- Saved and baptized church membership (Acts 2:41–2:47; 1Cor 12:12; 2Cor 6:14; Eph 4:3)
- Two offices of the church (Pastor and deacon) (1Tim 3:1–3:13)

Sometimes another "S" is added, making BAPTISTS:

- Separation of Church and State

== Practices ==
Baptists practice believer's baptism and the Eucharist, or Communion, as the ordinances instituted in Scripture (Matthew 28:19; 1 Corinthians 11:23-26). These are typically referred by as ordinances (meaning "obedience to a command that Christ has given us") which has historically been used by Baptists interchangeably with "sacraments" (activities God uses to impart salvation or a means of grace to the participant). Other sacraments include the laying on of hands and anointing of the sick, as expressed in the Standard Confession (1660), as well as Washing of the Saints’ feet. The communion and foot washing service is practiced regularly by members of the Separate Baptists in Christ, General Association of Baptists, Free Will Baptists, Primitive Baptists, Union Baptists, Old Regular Baptist, Christian Baptist Church of God. Certain churches in the Baptist tradition continue to practice head covering for Christian women as a biblical ordinance.

== Varying views ==
Baptists hold their services of worship on Sunday and first-day Sabbatarianism has been the dominant position among Baptists. However, there is a group known as the Seventh Day Baptists whose origins are derived from Anabaptism and the pre-Reformation. Seventh Day Baptists gather and worship on the seventh day of the week on Saturday. A large portion of Seventh Day Baptists adopted the teachings of the Sabbath, which led to the formation of the Seventh-day Adventist Church.

Baptists are descendants of the Separatists who, according to some, were probably influenced by Continental Anabaptists, like other Dissenters. Thus the Baptist tradition is considered an outcome of the Reformation. In the early 17th century, those individuals who called themselves Baptists dissented from the Church of England. Some notable Puritan dissenters included John Smyth and Thomas Helwys who were acknowledged as key pioneers for the Baptist denomination.

Furthermore, some Baptists (notably Landmarkists or "Baptist Bride" adherents) hold to a belief in perpetuity, which embraces the notion that the Baptists, under various names, have existed since the time of Christ until today as the Church of Christ founded in Jerusalem was Baptist. Those who believe in this Baptist perpetuity, view the Baptist tradition as not being a critical aspect of the Protestant Reformation.

== See also ==
- Baptists in the history of separation of church and state
- List of Baptist confessions of faith
