= Believers' Church =

Theological doctrine within Christianity

The believers' Church is a theological doctrine within Christianity which teaches that one becomes a member of the Church by new birth and profession of faith.

== History ==
This doctrine has its origin in the Radical Reformation within Anabaptism. The 1527 Schleitheim Confession by the Swiss Brethren, a group of Anabaptists of which Michael Sattler was part, is a publication that spread this doctrine. In this confession, the believer's baptism after a profession of faith is placed as an essential theological foundation. In 1644, the 1644 Baptist Confession of Faith published by Particular Baptists stated the same. In 1916, the Pentecostal Assemblies of God Statement of Fundamental Truths stated the same too. In 1967, the Believers' Church Conference was established at Southern Baptist Theological Seminary in Louisville, Kentucky, in the United States, and is held every two or three years at a different Evangelical Bible college.

== Doctrine ==
A widely accepted definition of characteristics is that of the American historian Donald Durnbaugh, who summarizes the doctrine of the believers' Church in seven points:

1. Voluntary membership in the church. One becomes a member of the Church by new birth and profession of faith. The baptism, reserved for adolescent or adult believers (believer's baptism), is a symbol of this commitment.
2. The Church is a fraternal community of mutual aid and edification.
3. Charity and service in the church are an expression of a healthy Christian life.
4. The Holy Spirit and the Bible are the only bases of authority in the Church. Some non-biblical religious traditions must be rejected. Members who do not respect the confession of faith of the Church and do not want to repent must be excommunicated from the community.
5. Willingness to return to the fundamentals of the Early Church.
6. A simple structure of the Church.
7. Faith in the Church as the body of Christ.

The doctrine of the believers' Church should not be confused with that of the free church, which is a concept designating the separate churches of states. Some Christian denominations that can be identified in the free church movement do not adhere to the doctrine of the believers' Church.

== Main adherent movements ==
Despite the nuances in the various evangelical movements, there is a similar set of beliefs for movements adhering to the doctrine of the believers' Church, the main ones being Anabaptism, Baptists and Pentecostalism.

== See also ==
- Church invisible
- World Evangelical Alliance
- Born again
