= List of Baptist denominations in India =

This list of Baptist denominations in India is a list of subdivisions of Baptists, with their various Baptist associations, conferences, conventions, fellowships, groups, and unions in India.

== List of denominations ==
- Ao Baptist Arogo Mungdang (Ao Baptist Churches Convention)
- Angami Baptist Church Council
- Apatani Christian Fellowship
- Arunachal Baptist Church Council
- Assam Baptist Convention
- Baptist Convention Coastal Andhra
- Baptist Christian Association
- Baptist Church of Mizoram
- Baptist Union of North India
- Bengal Baptist Fellowship
- Bengal Orissa Bihar Baptist Convention
- Boro Baptist Church Association
- Boro Baptist Convention
- Chang Baptist Lashong Thangyen (Chang Baptist Churches Association)
- Council of Baptist Churches in Northeast India
- Convention of Baptist Churches of the Northern Circars
- Evangelical Baptist Convention
- Faith Gospel Preaching Church, Hyderabad, India
- Garo Baptist Convention
- Gospel Association of India
- India Association of General Baptists
- Independent Gospel Baptist Churches And The Associated Missions
- Independent Baptist Ministries of India, Kerala (Independent Baptist Churches)
- Karbi-Anglong Baptist Convention
- Karnataka Baptist Convention
- Kuki Baptist Convention
- Lower Assam Baptist Union
- Maharashtra Baptist Society
- Manipur Baptist Convention
- Nagaland Baptist Church Council
- Faith Baptist Mission
- New Testament Baptist Churches’ Association
- Nyishi Baptist Church Council
- North Bank Baptist Christian Association
- Orissa Baptist Evangelical Crusade
- Rabha Baptist Church Union
- Samavesam of Telugu Baptist Churches
- Sadar North Baptist Association
- Separate Baptists in Christ
- Seventh Day Baptist Church
- Tamil Baptist Churches
- Tripura Baptist Christian Union of India

== Missionary Baptist Churches in Kerala ==
. Missionary Baptist Association of India

- List of Baptist denominations
- List of Christian denominations in India
- List of Christian denominations in North East India
