= Protestantism in India =

Protestants in India is a major tradition within Christianity in India, encompassing a variety of Protestant denominations and church traditions. Protestants in India are a small minority in a predominantly Hindu country. But, according to major think tanks like Pew Research Center and World Christian Database, the majority (approximately 60%) of Indian Christians are Protestants. They form majorities in the north-eastern states of Meghalaya, Mizoram and Nagaland. They are also significant minorities in Punjab region, Konkan region, Bengal, Kerala and Tamil Nadu, with various communities in east coast and northern states. Protestants can trace their origins back to the Protestant Reformation. In 2010, there were an estimated 20 million Protestants and 16 million Pentecostals in India.

== History ==
=== Colonial India ===
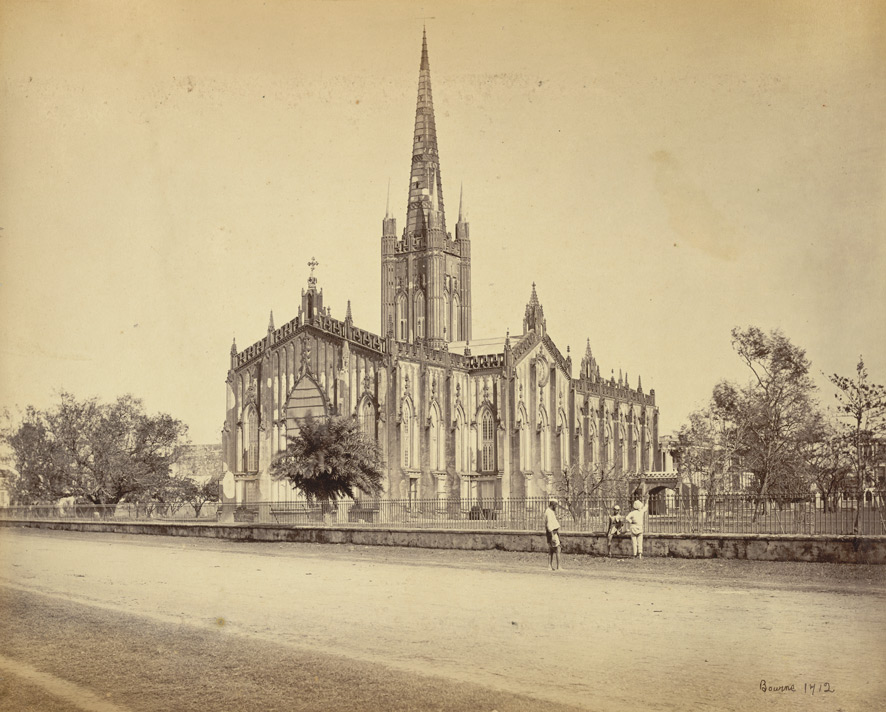
St. Paul's Cathedral was built in 1847 and served as the chair of the Bishop of Calcutta, who served as the metropolitan of the Church of India, Burma and Ceylon.

As the Anglican Church was the established church of England, "it had an impact on India with the arrival of the British". Citing the Great Commission, Joseph White, a Laudian Professor of Arabic at the University of Oxford, "preached before the university in 1784 on the duty of promoting the universal and progressive message of Christianity 'among our Mahometan and Gentoo Subjects in India'." In 1889, the Prime Minister of Great Britain, Robert Gascoyne-Cecil, 3rd Marquess of Salisbury expressed similar sentiments, stating that "It is not only our duty but is in our interest to promote the diffusion of Christianity as far as possible throughout the length and breadth of India."

The growth of the British Indian Army led to the arrival of many Anglican chaplains in India. Following the arrival of the Church of England's Church Mission Society in 1814, the Diocese of Calcutta of the Church of India, Burma and Ceylon (CIBC) was erected, with its St. Paul's Cathedral being built in 1847. By 1930, the Church of India, Burma and Ceylon had fourteen dioceses across the Indian Empire.

Missionaries from other Christian denominations came to British India as well; Lutheran missionaries, for example, arrived in Calcutta in 1836 and by "the year 1880 there were over 31,200 Lutheran Christians spread out in 1,052 villages". Methodists began arriving in India in 1783 and established missions with a focus on "education, health ministry, and evangelism". In the 1790s, Christians from the London Missionary Society and Baptist Missionary Society, began doing missionary work in the Indian Empire. In Neyoor, the London Missionary Society Hospital "pioneered improvements in the public health system for the treatment of diseases even before organized attempts were made by the colonial Madras Presidency, reducing the death rate substantially".

After 1857, the establishment of schools and hospitals by British Christian missionaries became "a pivotal feature of missionary work and the principal vehicles for conversion". Christ Church College (1866) and St. Stephen's College (1881) are two examples of prominent church-affiliated educational institutions founded during the colonial period in India. Within educational institutions established during the British Raj in India, Christian texts, especially the Bible, were a part of the curricula. During the colonial era in India, Christian missionaries developed writing systems for Indian languages that previously did not have one. Christian missionaries in India also worked to increase literacy and engaged in social activism, such as fighting against prostitution, championing the right of widowed women to remarry, and trying to stop early marriages for women. Among British women, zenana missions became a popular method to win converts to Christianity.

In colonial India, the All India Conference of Indian Christians (AICIC) played an important role in the Indian independence movement, advocating for swaraj and opposing the partition of India. The AICIC also was opposed to separate electorates for Christians, believing that the faithful "should participate as common citizens in one common, national political system". The All India Conference of Indian Christians and the All India Catholic Union formed a working committee with M. Rahnasamy of Andhra University serving as president and B.L. Rallia Ram of Lahore serving as General Secretary; in its meeting on 16 April 1947 and 17 April 1947, the joint committee prepared a 13-point memorandum that was sent to the Constituent Assembly of India, which asked for religious freedom for both organisations and individuals; this came to be reflected in the Constitution of India.

=== Independent India ===
Many Protestant denominations are represented in India, the result of missionary activities throughout the country especially under British rule in India. The largest Protestant denomination in the country is the Church of South India, since 1947 a union of Presbyterian, Reformed, Congregational, Methodist, and Anglican congregations with approximately 4 million members as of 2014. The broadly similar Church of North India had 1 million members. (Both churches are in full communion with the Anglican Communion.) There were about 1.3 million Lutherans, 473,000 Methodists, and 425,000 Baptists as of 1995.

Pentecostalism, one of the largest Protestant denominations worldwide, is also a rapidly growing denomination in India. It is spreading greatly in northern India and the southwestern areas, such as Kerala. The largest indigenous Pentecostal denominations in India are The Pentecostal Mission (TPM) and the India Pentecostal Church of God (IPC).

As for the smaller denominations, another prominent group is the Brethren. They include Plymouth Brethren, Indian Brethren, Kerala Brethren etc. The Conference of the Mennonite Brethren Churches in India has more than 100,000 members.

One of the oldest denominations meanwhile is the Northern Evangelical Lutheran Church.

== Notable missionaries ==
Protestant missionaries began to work throughout India, leading to the growth of different Christian communities. In 1793, William Carey, an English Baptist Minister, came to India as a missionary. He worked in Serampore, Calcutta and other cities founding churches. On the educational front, in addition to starting the Serampore College, he also translated the Bible into Bengali and Sanskrit, continuing with these labours until his death in 1834.Anthony Norris Groves, Plymouth Brethren missionary came to India in 1833. He worked in the Godavari delta area of then Madras Presidency, until his death in 1852.

Missionaries such as Amy Carmichael, Ida S. Scudder and Joyce M. Woollard continued the work in the 20th century.

== Demographics ==
According to the 2015 India Demographic and Health Survey, 2.6% of the population is Christian. Different surveys and reports project different figures for Indian Christianity. In 2011, Pew Research Center reported 18,860,000 Protestants (59.22%), out of a total of 31,850,000 Christians in India, based on their analysis of 2001 census of India. According to a 2021 Pew survey of Indian Christians, the largest Christian denominations in India based on their share of the total Indian Christian population were the Catholic Church (37%), Baptist church (13%), Church of South India (7%) and Church of North India (7%).

According to the World Christian Database, 71,120,000 Indians or 5% of the total population of India are Christians, as of 2023. Out of this, 34% are Protestants and a further 28.8% are Independents (mostly non-denominational Pentecostals/Charismatics who do not self-identify as Protestant), together making up the majority of Indian Christians (62.8%).

A report in 2021 noted that many Indian Christians share Hindu beliefs, in particular in karma (54%), and reincarnation (29%); it also noted that three-quarters of Indian Christians come from a lower-caste background.

== Protestant Churches in India ==
- Assemblies of God in India
- Ao Baptist Arogo Mungdang (Ao Baptist Churches Convention)
- Apatani Christian Fellowship
- Assam Baptist Convention
- Baptist Christian Association
- Baptist Church of Mizoram
- Baptist Union of North India
- Basel Mission
- Bengal Baptist Fellowship
- Bengal Orissa Bihar Baptist Convention.
- Congregational Church in India
- Church of North India
- Church of South India
- Evangelical Baptist Convention of India
- Evangelical Church of Maraland.
- Garo Baptist Convention
- Gospel Association of India
- Gossner Evangelical Lutheran Church in Chotanagpur and Assam
- India Association of General Baptists
- India Evangelical Lutheran Church IELC
- Jeypore Evangelical Lutheran Church
- Evangelical Church of India
- Karbi Anglong Baptist Convention
- Karnataka Baptist Convention
- Lower Assam Baptist Union
- Maharashtra Baptist Society
- Manipur Baptist Convention
- Mao Baptist Church
- Mennonite Brethren Church India
- Nagaland Baptist Church Council
- North Bank Baptist Christian Association
- North Western Gossner Evangelical Lutheran Church
- Orissa Baptist Evangelical Crusade
- Poumai Baptist Church
- Presbyterian Church in India
- Presbyterian Church in India (Reformed)
- Presbyterian Free Church of Central India
- Rabha Baptist Church Union
- Reformed Presbyterian Church of India
- Reformed Presbyterian Church North East India
- Presbyterian Church of South India
- Samavesam of Telugu Baptist Churches
- Separate Baptists in Christ
- Sumi Baptist Church
- Southern Asia Division of Seventh-day Adventists
- Seventh Day Baptist Church
- The Pentecostal Mission (formerly Ceylon Pentecostal Mission)
- Mar Thoma Church
- Tamil Baptist Churches
- Tamil Evangelical Lutheran Church
- Tirunelveli C.M.S. Evangelical Church
- Tripura Baptist Christian Union
- United Church of Northern India - Presbyterian Synod
- Indian Pentecostal Church of God

Source of the list: World Christian Encyclopedia.

== See also ==
- History of Pentecostalism in India
- Religion in India
- Christianity in India
- Baptists in India
- Anglicans in India
- Seventh-day Adventist Church in India
- List of Protestant missionaries in India
