= Christianity in Assam =

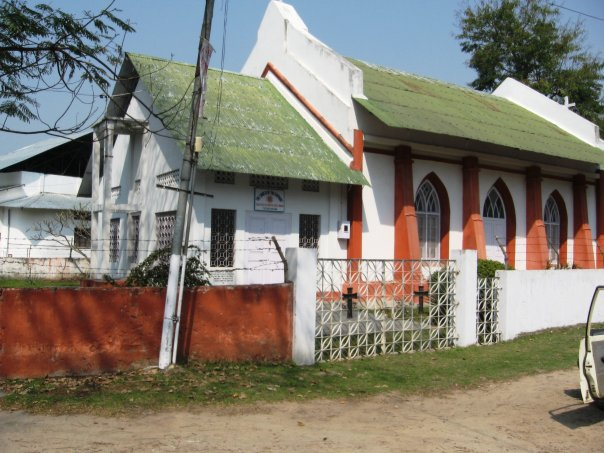
A church at Tezpur in the Brahmaputra Valley. Assam was the gateway through which organised Christianity entered northeast India.

Christianity in Assam is the third largest religion in the state, after Hinduism and Islam. According to the 2011 Census of India, Christians in Assam numbered 1,165,867, or about 3.74 per cent of the state's population, up from 986,589 in 2001. Although that proportion is small beside the Christian-majority states of Mizoram, Nagaland and Meghalaya, Assam holds a distinctive place in the history of the faith in Northeast India, because the mission work begun in the Assamese-speaking Brahmaputra Valley in the 1830s became the base from which Protestant Christianity spread across the surrounding hills.

The community is drawn overwhelmingly from groups outside the Hindu Assamese and Muslim Bengali mainstream. Its two largest components are the Scheduled Tribes, chiefly the Bodo, Karbi and Garo, and the tea-garden community, the descendants of Adivasi labourers brought from the Chota Nagpur Plateau and central India to work the plantations in colonial times. Of about 1.17 million Christians counted in 2011, only some 495,000 belonged to the Scheduled Tribes, about 42.5 per cent of the total, the remaining majority being largely from the tea-garden and other non-tribal communities.

The faith is unevenly distributed. Its strongholds are the hill and Bodoland districts, with Dima Hasao recording about 29.6 per cent Christians and Karbi Anglong about 16.5 per cent, while in the lower Barak Valley and the densely settled central plains Christians are very few. Beyond its size, the influence of Christianity in Assam has been felt most strongly in two fields, education and the Assamese language, for the printing press and schools brought by the first missionaries played a central part in the modernisation of Assamese letters.

Religion in Assam (2011)
Religion	Percent
Hinduism	61.47%
Islam	34.22%
Christianity	3.74%
Others/not stated	0.57%

== Background ==
=== Assam before the missions ===
For six centuries before the arrival of the British the Brahmaputra Valley was dominated by the Ahom kingdom, while the surrounding hills were home to a great variety of peoples, among them the Bodo-Kachari groups of the plains and foothills, the Karbi and Dimasa of the central hills, and the Khasi, Naga and other communities along the frontiers. The plains population was largely Hindu, much of it shaped by the Ekasarana Dharma reform movement of the medieval saint Sankardev, with a large Muslim presence of long standing, while many of the hill and plains tribes followed their own traditional religions, such as Bathouism among the Bodo. Assam passed under East India Company control after the Treaty of Yandabo of 1826, which ended a period of Burmese occupation and brought the region into the Bengal Presidency. The new administration encouraged the growth of a tea industry and sought to bring order to the frontier peoples, and it was partly in the hope that missions would help to educate and settle the tribes that Company officers first invited Christian missionaries into Assam.

=== Earliest Christian contact ===
The first recorded Christian presence in Assam was fleeting. On 26 September 1626 two Jesuits of the Cochin province, Estêvão Cacella and João Cabral, reached Hajo and the area of present-day Guwahati while travelling from Hooghly towards Tibet. They founded no congregation, being only in transit, but they are remembered as the first Christian missionaries to set foot in the region. A small Catholic community of Portuguese soldiers and their families existed in the seventeenth century at a Mughal outpost at Rangamati, on the western fringe of the region, but no lasting church grew from these contacts, and more than two centuries passed before sustained Christian work began.

== The American Baptist Mission ==
=== Origins of the Shan Mission ===
Organised and lasting Christian work in Assam began with the American Baptist Foreign Mission Society, which already had missionaries in Burma. Officers of the Company administration, in particular Francis Jenkins, the Agent to the Governor-General on the north-east frontier, encouraged the Burma Baptists to extend their work to Assam, hoping that they might reach the Shan and other frontier tribes and open a route towards China. On 23 March 1836 the Reverend Nathan Brown and the printer Oliver Thomas Cutter, with their wives, reached Sadiya at the far eastern edge of Assam, bringing with them a printing press. They were joined in 1838 by Miles Bronson and Jacob Thomas. The route to China never opened, and the languages of Sadiya proved unrelated to Burmese, so the mission turned its attention to the people among whom it found itself.

=== Relocation and consolidation ===
The early stations were precarious. After the Khamti rising at Sadiya in 1839 the work was moved upriver, first to Jaipur and Naharkatiya and then to Sibsagar, where the press was re-established in 1845 as the Sibsagar Mission Press. In late 1844 Brown walked from Sibsagar to Guwahati, studying the peoples along the way, and on 25 January 1845, with Miles Bronson and Cyrus Barker, he organised the first Baptist church of the valley at Panbazar in Guwahati. The missionaries also founded schools, beginning a tradition of mission education that continued through the century. The work spread along the river towns of upper Assam and, from the Guwahati base, towards the Bodo of the north bank and the hill peoples beyond.

=== The Orunodoi and the Assamese language ===
The most far-reaching legacy of the Baptist press was secular rather than religious. From 1836 the colonial government, in the mistaken belief that Assamese was merely a dialect of Bengali, had made Bengali the language of the courts and schools of Assam, opening a period later called the Dark Age of the Assamese language. The Baptist missionaries, who had learned and printed in Assamese, became prominent champions of the language. In January 1846 the mission published from Sibsagar, under Brown's editorship, Orunodoi (the sunrise), the first magazine in the Assamese language. Conceived as a monthly devoted to religion, science and general intelligence, it ran with occasional breaks until about 1880 and became a nursery of modern Assamese prose.

Orunodoi drew in a generation of Assamese writers, among them Anandaram Dhekial Phukan, Hemchandra Barua and Gunabhiram Barua, whose work, together with the petitions of the missionaries Brown and Bronson, pressed the government to reverse its policy. Brown's Grammatical Notices of the Assamese Language (1848) and Bronson's A Dictionary in Assamese and English (1867), the latter containing about 14,000 entries and printed at the Sibsagar press, gave the language scholarly standing. In 1873 the colonial authorities restored Assamese as the language of administration and instruction, and the change was confirmed when Assam became a separate Chief Commissioner's province in 1874. The contribution of the American Baptist Mission to this revival is widely acknowledged in Assamese historiography.

=== Bible translation and first converts ===
Nathan Brown translated the New Testament into Assamese, publishing it in 1848 under the title Amar Tronkorta Jisu Christor Notun Niyom, and in 1854 issued a further work on the life and teaching of Christ; Bronson and others produced additional scripture, hymns and devotional material. The first native convert in the whole of northeast India is generally said to be Nidhiram, a man of the Kaibarta community, who was baptised by Bronson on 13 June 1841 and took the name Nidhi Levi Farwell; he later became a contributor to Orunodoi and a respected figure in Assamese letters. Conversions among the settled Hindu population of the valley remained few, but the mission gained a foothold that would prove decisive once it reached the tribes. An Assamese convert, Godhula Brown, together with the missionary E. W. Clark, carried the gospel into the Naga Hills, where the first Naga church was organised in 1872 at Molungyimjen in the Ao country, an event that opened the great expansion of Baptist Christianity across the eastern hills.

=== The Council of Baptist Churches ===
As Baptist congregations multiplied, indigenous Christians began to organise. In 1914 they formed the Assam Baptist Christian Convention, and in January 1950 the various bodies were brought together as the Council of Baptist Churches in Assam, later renamed the Council of Baptist Churches in Northeast India (CBCNEI), with its headquarters in the old mission compound at Panbazar in Guwahati. The council is today one of the largest Baptist groupings in India, reported by the World Council of Churches to comprise about 1.2 million members in some 7,500 congregations across the northeastern states, and it operates hospitals, nursing schools and a network of theological colleges, including the Eastern Theological College at Jorhat, founded in 1950.

== Anglican and chaplaincy presence ==
A parallel English-speaking Protestant presence grew out of the colonial chaplaincy. Christ Church at Panbazar in Guwahati traces its beginnings to the arrival of the first chaplain of Assam, the Reverend Robert Bland, on 9 May 1844. The neo-Gothic building, damaged by the severe earthquakes of the later nineteenth century and rebuilt in 1901, is often described as the first church of the northeastern region and a landmark in the institutional establishment of Christianity there. Anglican work later extended to the Bodo and to the tea-garden labour force, though it remained relatively small; many of these congregations passed in 1970 into the united Church of North India.

== The Catholic Church ==
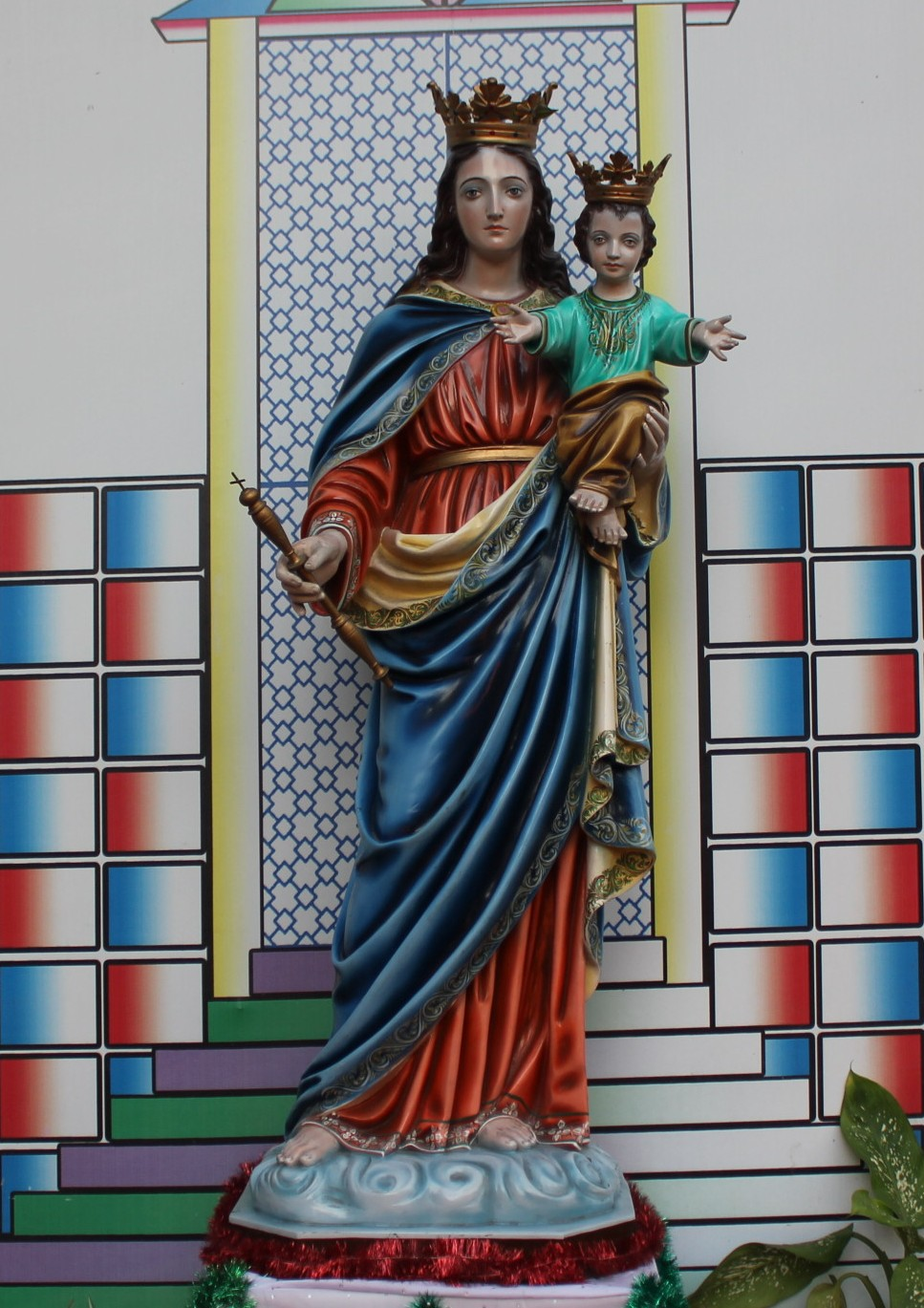
A Salesian church at Guwahati. The Salesians of Don Bosco took charge of the Assam mission in 1921 and built an extensive network of schools.

=== Foreign mission societies ===
Sustained Catholic work resumed in the mid-nineteenth century, more than two hundred years after the brief Jesuit visit. In June 1850 three priests of the Paris Foreign Missions Society, among them Nicolas Krick, reached Guwahati; Krick and his companion Augustin Bourry were killed in the Mishmi Hills in 1854 while trying to reach Tibet. In 1883 Father Jacopo Broy of the Milan Foreign Missions settled in Guwahati and built a brick church, regarded by some accounts as the first Catholic church in Assam, and from there he cared for the scattered mission.

=== Prefecture of Assam and the Salvatorians ===
The decisive step came in 1889, when the Holy See created the Prefecture Apostolic of Assam, with its headquarters at Shillong, and entrusted it to the German Salvatorians. Fathers Gallus Schrole and Rudolph Fontaine reached Guwahati in February 1890, and by this time many tribal Catholics from Chota Nagpur were already at work in the tea gardens, forming the nucleus of a substantial Catholic population. The outbreak of the First World War forced the German fathers to leave, and the Jesuits of Calcutta cared for the mission until it could be reassigned.

=== Salesians of Don Bosco ===
In 1921 the Assam mission was given to the Salesians of Don Bosco, who arrived in 1922 under the leadership of Father Louis Mathias. The Salesians, an order founded by Saint John Bosco with a special vocation for the education of the young, transformed the Catholic presence in Assam through schools, technical training and social work. Among the best known of the early Salesians were Stephen Ferrando, later the founder of the Missionary Sisters of Mary Help of Christians, and Oreste Marengo, who as a young missionary travelled the villages learning the local languages. The Salesians opened Don Bosco schools in Guwahati and elsewhere, beginning with an orphanage and technical school in the 1920s, and the network later grew to include the Assam Don Bosco University, established at Azara near Guwahati in 2008. The present Catholic structure of Assam grew out of this work, with the dioceses of Dibrugarh (1951), Tezpur (1964), Diphu (1983), the Archdiocese of Guwahati (1992) and Bongaigaon (2000) among its units.

== Lutheran and Presbyterian missions ==
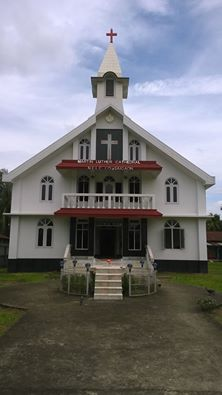
The Martin Luther Cathedral at Gossaigaon, a church of the Northern Evangelical Lutheran Church, whose members include Santals and Bodos.

=== Santal and Lutheran mission ===
A distinct Lutheran tradition reached western Assam through the Santal Mission of the Northern Churches, founded in 1867 to 1868 by the Dane Hans Peter Boerresen and the Norwegian Lars Olsen Skrefsrud. Working first among Santal migrants and later among the Bodo, the mission established a colony in the Goalpara area, and its missionaries, among them Holger Winding and Aksel Kristiansen in the 1920s, gathered Bodo and Santal congregations. This body developed into the Northern Evangelical Lutheran Church, whose members are chiefly Santal with Bodo and Bengali minorities, and which is one of several Lutheran churches active in the region alongside the Bodo Evangelical Lutheran Church and the Gossner Evangelical Lutheran Church. Its Martin Luther Cathedral stands at Gossaigaon.

=== Welsh Presbyterian work ===
Presbyterian Christianity entered Assam from the neighbouring Khasi Hills, where the Welsh Calvinistic Methodist mission had begun work from 1841 under Thomas Jones, who reduced the Khasi language to writing. From the Khasi and Jaintia Hills the movement spread south and east, reaching the Cachar valley by the 1890s and giving rise to the Cachar Hill Tribes Presbyterian Synod among the hill peoples of southern Assam.

== Spread among communities ==
=== Bodo people ===
The Bodo, the largest of the plains tribes of Assam, form one of the two largest Christian communities in the state. American Baptist work among the Bodo developed from the Guwahati station, and in 1914 the Reverend George Richard Kampfer of the American Baptist mission established the first Bodo Baptist church at Borigaon, near Udalguri. The congregations of the area came together as a Christian association that grew into the Boro Baptist Convention, with its headquarters at Harisinga in Udalguri district, which marked its centenary in 2014. Bodo Christians are divided chiefly between this Baptist body and the Lutheran churches; converts gave up the traditional Bathou rituals, such as the Kherai and Garja pujas, and adopted Christmas, Good Friday and Easter, and they brought church marriage and mission schooling into Bodo society.

The growth of Christianity was one of several forces reshaping Bodo religious life in the early twentieth century. A parallel reform movement, Brahma Dharma, was launched among the Bodo by Gurudev Kalicharan Brahma (1862 to 1938), who offered a structured, monotheistic alternative that drew many Bodo away from both traditional Bathouism and Christianity, so that the Bodo today remain divided among Bathou, Brahma, Christian, Hindu and other allegiances.

=== Karbi, Dimasa and the hill tribes ===
In the central and southern hills Christianity spread among the Karbi, Dimasa, Kuki, Hmar and Naga, partly through the American Baptists working outward from the plains and partly through Presbyterian work radiating from the Khasi Hills and Cachar. Among the Karbi the Karbi Anglong Baptist Convention became the principal church, and Christian institutions are prominent in the two autonomous hill districts of Karbi Anglong and Dima Hasao, where Christians form the largest share of the population. The smaller hill peoples, such as the Hmar and the Kuki, are very largely Christian, in keeping with the pattern of the wider Kuki-Chin world.

=== Garo ===
The Garo, whose homeland lies mainly in the Garo Hills of present-day Meghalaya but who are also settled in the Goalpara and Kamrup areas of Assam, are among the most thoroughly Christianised communities counted in the state, the great majority being Baptist with a substantial Catholic minority. Garo Christianity grew from American Baptist work begun in the Garo Hills in the 1860s and remains organised today under bodies linked to the Council of Baptist Churches.

=== Tea-garden community ===
A large part, indeed the majority, of the Christian population of Assam belongs not to the indigenous tribes but to the tea-garden community. These are the descendants of labourers, drawn from Adivasi peoples such as the Oraon, Munda and others of the Chota Nagpur plateau and central India, who were brought to Assam during the nineteenth and early twentieth centuries to work the tea plantations. Many were already Christian, or were evangelised in Assam by both Catholic and Baptist missions, and the Catholic strongholds of upper Assam, around Dibrugarh and Tinsukia, owe much of their size to this community. Although the tea-garden Adivasis are recognised as Scheduled Tribes in several other states, they are not so recognised in Assam, and the long campaign for Scheduled Tribe status, in which Christian Adivasis have been prominent, remains a live political question.

== Education ==
Mission schooling was, from the first, central to the Christian presence in Assam, and it left a mark on the wider society out of all proportion to the size of the Christian community. The American Baptists opened Assamese-medium schools from the 1840s and printed the textbooks used in them, while the standard of the Sibsagar press and of works such as Bronson's dictionary supported the teaching of Assamese throughout the province. The Catholic contribution to education came above all through the Salesians of Don Bosco, whose schools became among the most sought after in the region; the Don Bosco network in Assam grew from the early orphanage and technical school in Guwahati into a chain of institutions across the state and the wider northeast, culminating in the Assam Don Bosco University. Protestant and Catholic schools alike are credited with raising literacy and producing much of the educated tribal and tea-garden leadership of modern Assam.

== Health care ==
Medical work accompanied evangelism and schooling. The Baptist mission opened dispensaries and hospitals from the late nineteenth century, including the Jorhat Christian Hospital, which grew from a small dispensary opened by Dr Kirby in 1919 into a hospital with a nursing school by the 1930s, and a major medical programme for women at the Satribari compound in Guwahati. The Council of Baptist Churches in North East India today runs six hospitals and five nursing schools, while Catholic congregations and religious orders operate further hospitals, dispensaries and homes for the sick and the poor, continuing a tradition in which medicine was one of the chief points of contact between the missions and the wider population.

== Culture and society ==
The cultural influence of Christianity in Assam has been felt most clearly in language and education, but it extends further. The conversion of tribal communities such as the Bodo brought with it the replacement of traditional festivals and rituals by the Christian calendar of Christmas, Good Friday and Easter, changes in marriage and social custom, and the spread of the Roman script and of mission schooling. Among the small Assamese-speaking Christian community, Christian practice has tended to blend with the regional culture, with worship in Assamese and participation in the wider life of Assamese society, and Christian hymnody and literature in Assamese form part of the larger body of work that the missions helped to call into being. The most enduring social legacy, widely recognised by Assamese writers regardless of religion, is the part the missionaries played in defending and standardising the Assamese language during the decades when it had been displaced by Bengali.

== Demographics ==
According to the 2011 census Christians numbered 1,165,867 in Assam, having risen from 986,589 in 2001. After Islam, Christianity has been among the faster growing religions of the state in proportional terms over the long run, although its share of the total population has remained modest because growth has been concentrated in the tribal and tea-garden communities rather than in the Hindu and Muslim majorities.

Christians in Assam
Year	Number	Percentage
2001	986,589	3.70
2011	1,165,867	3.74

Historical Christian population in Assam
Year	Pop.	±%
1901	13,638	—
1911	22,817	+67.3%
1921	41,686	+82.7%
1931	79,025	+89.6%
1951	160,438	+103.0%
1961	263,134	+64.0%
1971	381,010	+44.8%
1981	534,572	+40.3%
1991	744,367	+39.2%
2001	986,589	+32.5%
2011	1,165,867	+18.2%
Source: Census of India

=== Growth by decade ===
The share of Christians in Assam grew slowly under colonial rule and then more steadily after independence, as the tea-garden community and the hill and plains tribes were progressively evangelised. The figures below are drawn from the census and from analyses of census data.

Year	Percent	Change
1901	0.41%	–
1911	0.59%	+0.18%
1921	0.90%	+0.31%
1931	1.42%	+0.52%
1951	2.00%	+0.58%
1961	2.43%	+0.43%
1971	2.61%	+0.18%
1981	2.96%	+0.35%
1991	3.32%	+0.36%
2001	3.70%	+0.38%
2011	3.74%	+0.04%

=== Population by district ===
The 2011 distribution shows Christianity concentrated in the hill and Bodoland districts and very thin in the lower Brahmaputra and Barak plains.

Christian population in Assam by district (2011)
#	District	Total population	Christian population	%
1	Karbi Anglong	956,313	157,789	16.50%
2	Sonitpur	1,924,110	138,166	7.18%
3	Udalguri	831,668	110,215	13.25%
4	Kokrajhar	887,142	101,091	11.40%
5	Goalpara	1,008,183	77,862	7.72%
6	Tinsukia	1,327,929	76,877	5.79%
7	Dima Hasao	214,102	63,310	29.57%
8	Dibrugarh	1,326,335	52,968	3.99%
9	Golaghat	1,066,888	50,582	4.74%
10	Chirang	482,162	49,747	10.32%
11	Lakhimpur	1,042,137	46,217	4.43%
12	Cachar	1,736,617	37,635	2.17%
13	Kamrup	1,517,542	33,297	2.19%
14	Sivasagar	1,151,050	33,147	2.88%
15	Baksa	950,075	27,076	2.85%
16	Nagaon	2,823,768	26,844	0.95%
17	Jorhat	1,092,256	21,051	1.93%
18	Kamrup Metropolitan	1,253,938	18,810	1.50%
19	Karimganj	1,228,686	11,990	0.98%
20	Dhemaji	686,133	8,711	1.27%
21	Hailakandi	659,296	8,480	1.29%
22	Bongaigaon	738,804	5,924	0.80%
23	Dhubri	1,949,258	4,107	0.21%
24	Darrang	928,500	1,688	0.18%
25	Barpeta	1,693,622	1,020	0.06%
26	Morigaon	957,423	834	0.09%
27	Nalbari	771,639	429	0.06%
	Assam (total)	31,205,576	1,165,867	3.74%

=== Population by tribe ===
Christianity is near universal among some of the smaller tribes and a minority faith among the larger plains communities. The figures below are from an analysis of the 2011 census.

Tribe	Christians	Percent
Garo	154,353	95.63%
Boro	136,869	10.05%
Karbi	75,883	17.63%
Kuki	31,573	94.53%
Naga	19,924	66.93%
Hmar	15,557	98.81%
Khasi	13,956	87.58%
Rabha	9,845	3.32%
Mising	5,984	0.88%
Lalung (Tiwa)	2,808	15.38%
Sonowal	1,416	0.56%
Dimasa	1,144	1.11%

== Contemporary situation ==
Christian life in Assam today is organised around the major denominational councils and is represented in public affairs by ecumenical bodies such as the Assam Christian Forum and the regional North East India Christian Council, which speak on matters affecting the community. Two issues have been prominent in recent decades. The first is the demand of the tea-garden Adivasi community, in which Christians are numerous, for Scheduled Tribe status in Assam, a recognition they hold in several neighbouring states but not in Assam itself. The second is the wider debate over citizenship and identity in the northeast, including the National Register of Citizens and the Citizenship (Amendment) Act, 2019, which has affected Christian as well as other minority communities and has drawn responses from church bodies in the region. Relations between the Christian minority and the Hindu and Muslim majorities are generally peaceable, though debates over conversion and over the public place of religion recur, as they do across India.

== Denominations ==
The Christian community of Assam is divided among many denominations, reflecting the variety of missions that worked in the state. The largest groupings are Baptist and Roman Catholic, with significant Lutheran, Presbyterian and Pentecostal bodies and a number of smaller independent churches. Major denominations and church associations active in Assam include the following.

- Council of Baptist Churches in Northeast India and its constituent conventions
- Assam Baptist Convention
- Boro Baptist Convention and the Boro Baptist Church Association
- Karbi Anglong Baptist Convention
- Rabha Baptist Church Union
- North Bank Christian Association
- Cachar Hill Tribes Presbyterian Synod
- Northern Evangelical Lutheran Church and the Bodo Evangelical Lutheran Church
- Roman Catholic Archdiocese of Guwahati and the dioceses of Dibrugarh, Tezpur, Diphu and Bongaigaon
- Church of North India
- Kuki Christian Church
- United Pentecostal Church in India
- Seventh-day Adventist Church
- Christian Revival Church

== See also ==
- Christianity in Northeast India
- List of Christian denominations in North East India
- Christianity in India
- Islam in Assam
- Orunodoi
- Nathan Brown (missionary)
- Miles Bronson
- Council of Baptist Churches in Northeast India
