= Mising Baptist Kebang =

Mising Baptist Kebang (MBK) is a Baptist churches convention based in Assam, India. It has six associations and is spread across six districts of Assam. It is an associate member of the Council of Baptist Churches in Northeast India, and has over 116 churches affiliated under MBK with 4,300 members. The MBK is made primarily of Mishing people, an indigenous ethnic group of Assam. The MBK mission center is at Moinapara, Gogamukh in Dhemaji District of Assam state.

== History ==
Mising Baptist Kébang (Convention) was established in 2005 by leaders of various Mising Baptist Churches in Assam as a network organization for all the Mising Baptist Churches. The Mission Secretary of [Council of Baptist Churches in Northeast India] (CBCNEI), Rev. Dr. Dusanü Venyo and General Secretary of CBCNEI Rev. Dr. Ngul Khan Pou helped establish the MBK as an associate member church of the CBCNEI.

== Zonal Associations ==
There are 8 zonal associations under the MBK, namely,

1. Dhemaji Mising Baptist Kebang, Kulajan,
2. Jonai Mising Baptist Kebang,
3. Takam Mising Baptist Kebang, Kalbari, Jorhat
4. Majuli Mising Baptist Kebang, Lakhimi,
5. Sonitpur Mising Baptist Kebang, 14 No. Gohpur
6. Sadiya Mising Baptist Kebang,
7. Margherita Mising Baptist Fellowship, Jagun, and
8. Dhakuakhana Mising Baptist Association, Milan Nagar.

== See also ==
- Boro Baptist Convention
- Boro Baptist Church Association
- Rabha Baptist Convention
- Garo Baptist Convention
- Nagaland Baptist Church Council
- Manipur Baptist Convention
- Council of Baptist Churches in Northeast India
- North East India Christian Council
- List of Christian denominations in North East India
