= Rabha Baptist Church Union =

Rabha Baptist Convention
- Kocha Rabha
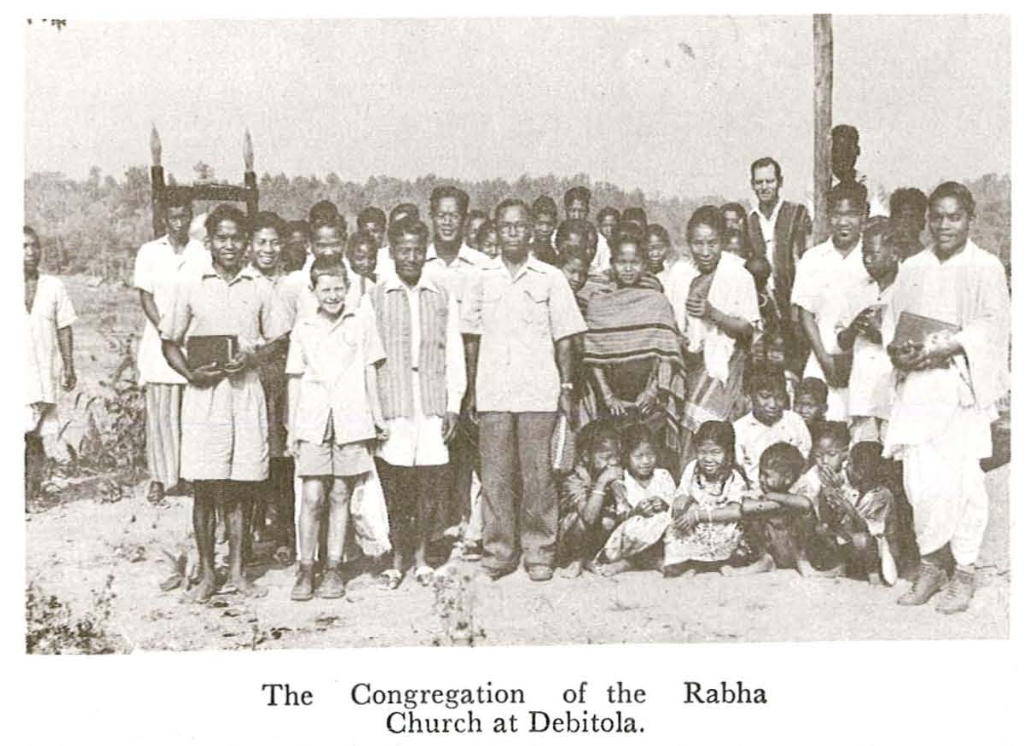
- First Congregation at Kalbandhari Pt-II, Debitola, Kokrajhar Assam, 6th May 1959
- Abbreviation: RBC
- Classification: Evangelicalism
- Orientation: Baptist
- Polity: Congregational
- Region: Meghalaya, Assam and West Bengal
- Language: Rabha (Kocha Dialect)
- Headquarters: Assam, India
- Founder: Australian Baptist Missionary Society (ABMS)
- Origin: 1959; Kalbhandari, Assam
- Congregations: 64
- Members: 12,356
- Official website: rbc.org

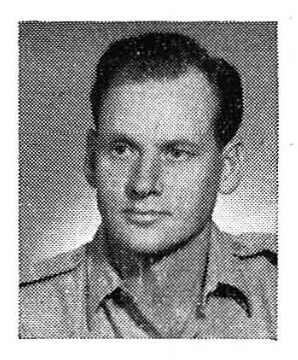
Rev. Rex Glasby, Australian Baptist Missionary Among Kocha Rabha 1959

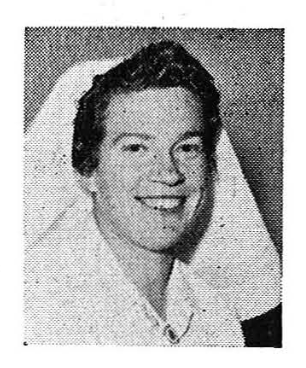
Becky McDonald, Missionary, Debitola, Kokrajhar, Assam

Rabha Baptist Convention (RBC), previously known as “Rabha Baptist Church Union”, is a Baptist Christian denomination in India. It is in the East of India, primarily in the state of Assam. The Union is made up primarily of Rabha people, an indigenous ethnic group of northeastern India.

== History ==
In the period 1930–32, Christianity was introduced to the tribes and two young Rabhas accepted Christianity. The number of Christian families increased to around 20 families and a church established in Kalbhandari.
Two Rabhas, Kamakya and Ganesh Rabha, approached the Glasbys, Australian missionaries of the Australian Baptist Missionary Society, for help revitalising the church after many families had returned to Hinduism. The first Rabha Baptist Church was established at Kalbhandari on May 6, 1959. Rev Rex Glasby formulated the name “Rabha Baptist Church Union”, registering the RBCU under the society of Registration Act. 1960. The change of name to "Rabha Baptist Convention” occurred on February 14, 2014.

In 2017, the RBC has 12,356 members in 64 churches of Meghalaya, Assam and West Bengal, and eight fellowships.

== See also ==
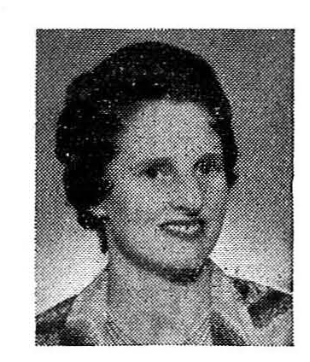
Peggy Glasby, Missionary at Debitola, Kokrajhar, Assam

- Council of Baptist Churches in Northeast India
- List of Christian denominations in North East India
- Boro Baptist Church Association
- Boro Baptist Convention
- Mising Baptist Kebang
- Assam Baptist Convention
- Garo Baptist Convention
- Nagaland Baptist Church Council
- Arunachal Baptist Church Council
- Assam Baptist Convention
