= Evangelical Baptist Convention =

Christian denomination in India

Evangelical Baptist Convention is a Baptist Christian denomination in Manipur, India. Their main area of presence is in the southern part of Manipur. It is affiliated with the Asia Pacific Baptist Federation (Baptist World Alliance). Its headquarters, Dorcas Hall, is located at Hebron Veng, New Lamka.

== History ==
The Convention was started in the year 1948, as a result of the work of missionaries in northeast India. According to a census published by the association in 2023, it claimed 151 churches.

== Administration ==
The Convention is headed by the General Secretary, who is elected for a term of three years. There are three Directors under him. The Church is divided into seven administrative divisions, each under a Divisional Superintendent, who is also elected for a term of three years.

=== Divisions ===
- Lamka North Division
- Lamka South Division
- Lamka East Division
- Lamka South Division

The Evangelical Baptist Convention Lamka South Division currently comprises 29 local EBC Churches (Bethlehem, College Veng, D Leikot, Dorcas Veng, Elim Veng, G Mualkawi, Geljang, Hebron, Jordan, Kanaan, Khominthang, Lamzang, Lanva, Mission Compound, Mata, Mualpi, Mualtam, Nghathal, Peniel, Pethuel, Takvom, Tangnuam, Tonglon P, Tonglon T, Thingkangphai, V Munhoih, Vaal Veng, Vengnuam, Zion) ministered by 22 pastors. Its Division Head Office is located in Convention Road, Dorcas Road, New Lamka - 795006 behind the Grace Bible College campus. Supervised by a Divisional Superintendent, this Division Head Office has 7 staffs.

- Singngat Division
- Thanlon Division
- Vangai Division
- Mizoram Division
- Imphal Division (Believed to have ended due to the present Violence in Manipur)

=== Mission field ===
The greatest duty of the Evangelical Baptist Convention is to praise and worship God. Missions are thus its priority.

The present involvement of the Evangelical Baptist Convention in missions is as follows:

- Karbi Anglong Field:

The focused people group are the Karbi tribes of Assam State. The methods adopted are evangelism, church planting, and school. There are 11 local churches with a membership of 1250. 16 missionaries are working in this field.

- Manipur Field:

The focused people group are the Hindu Meiteis. The methods adopted are evangelism, church planting, and school. There are 12 local churches and three fellowships with a membership of 638. 23 missionaries are working in this field.

- Nepal Field:

The focused people group are the Hindu Nepalese of eastern part of Nepal. The methods adopted are evangelism, church planting, and vocational training. There are 11 local churches and five new fellowships with a membership of 837. 14 missionaries are working in this field.

- Arunachal Pradesh:

The Evangelical Baptist Convention is working in partnership with Tangsa Baptist Churches Association. The focused people group are the Tangsa tribes of Changlang District. The methods adopted are evangelism, school, and music. The Evangelical Baptist Convention sends six missionaries and supports five native missionaries.

- Demaji Field, Assam

=== Institutions ===
- Grace Bible College, an M Div level institution, is the only theological training institute of the Evangelical Baptist Convention. The college has a very minimal, basic infrastructure in order to accommodate more students, who come not only from Manipur, but also from neighbouring states, and from Nepal and Myanmar. The college is unable to meet these requirements on its own. The church regards Grace Bible College as its backbone because the future of the church lies in the quality of training inculcated to its students. Grace Bible College is a degree college and confers up to M.Div. accredited by Asia Theological Association.
- Lamka Rehabilitation and Research Centre is a church-based non-governmental organization NGO working in the field of the prevention of drug abuse; HIV/AIDS harm reduction, care and support; and rehabilitation of drug addicts in the district.
- Ebenezer Academy, established in 1980, is an English medium high school recognized by the Board of Secondary Education and the Council of Higher Secondary Education in Manipur. It is located in the secretariat compound Dorcas Hall of the Evangelical Baptist Convention. The church is its main sponsor.
- Schools: Because of the inadequate functioning of government-run schools in the interior, remote, and far-flung hill areas, the church responds to this need. The impracticality of running tuition-fee schools in these areas is another challenge. There are a total of 58 schools with 4,259 students. The beneficiaries are 57 villages, including students of other denominations and non-believers. This requires sufficient manpower and infrastructures, financial support from well wishers, and charitable organizations. The Evangelical Baptist Convention runs:
  - Higher secondary school (1)
  - High schools (2)
  - Junior high schools (10)
  - JB schools (29)
  - LP schools (16)
- Convention Press has a regular staff of five, and two casual workers. Its assets include offset printer, electronic etc, print - KTZ (church journal), commentaries, documents, school questions, and orders from elsewhere.
- Evangelical Book House caters to school textbooks, theological books, and stationery items. It has four regular staff and two casual workers.

== Affiliation ==
The Evangelical Baptist Convention is affiliated to Baptist World Alliance.

== See also ==
- Council of Baptist Churches in Northeast India
- North East India Christian Council
- List of Christian denominations in North East India
