= Mizo Conference of Seventh-day Adventist =

Seventh-day Adventist conference in Mizoram, India

Mizo Conference
- Type: Religious/Non-Profit
- Headquarters: Aizawl, Mizoram
- Coordinates: 23.737°N 92.708°E
- Region served: Mizoram
- President: Pr Biakzidinga
- Parent organization: Northeast India Union, General Conference of Seventh-day Adventists
- Website: Mizo Conference

The Seventh-day Adventist Church in Mizoram is formally organised as the Mizo Conference of Seventh-day Adventist. It is one of the conferences of the Northeast India Union of Seventh-day Adventists under the Southern Asia Division of Seventh-day Adventists. It currently has 81 Churches and 22,446 members.

== History ==
Seventh-day Adventist Church arrived in 1946. It was initiated by Lallianzuala Sailo, who first made contact with the Seventh-day Adventist Church at Shillong in Meghalaya in November 1946. OW Lange was the first Adventist missionary to Mizoram. The first Adventist School was started by Willis G. Lowry and Helen Lowry on 17 January 1950. Mizoram section became the first conference in Southern Asia Division of Seventh-day Adventists in 1993.

== Church Statistics ==
Some Important statisticks of the Mizo Conference of Seventh day Adventist are as follows:

Statistics (as of 2024)	Number
Organized Church	83
Company Church	41
Isolated congregations	191
Minister (Pastor, etc.)	33
Mission Schools	4
Church Schools	17
College	1
Total members	19,204

== Location ==
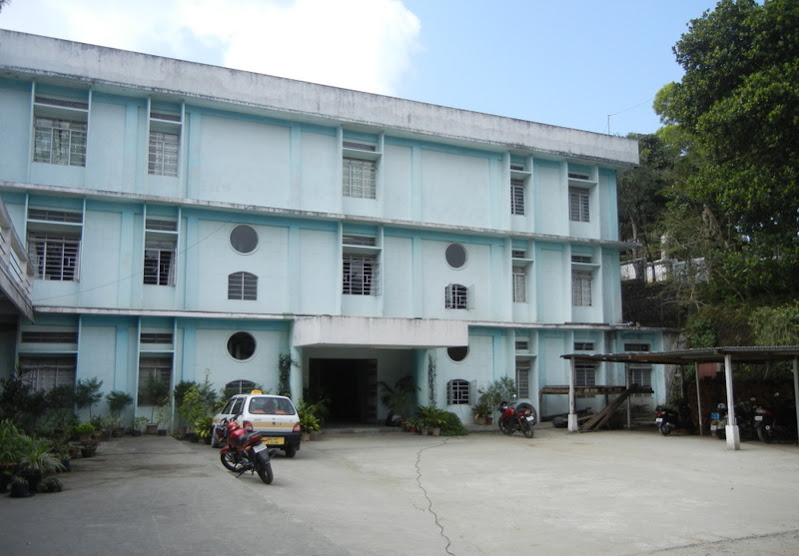
Mizo Conference of SDA Office

Its office is located in Seventhday Tlang, Aizawl.

== Media Center ==
Adventist World Radio (AWR) has a studio in Mizoram. It was inaugurated on February 27, 2003.

== Institutions ==
Mizo Conference has the following Institutions:

- Helen Lowry College of Arts & Commerce, Aizawl
- Southern Flower School, Lunglei
- Graceland Adventist School, Keifang
- Adventist English Academy, Saitual
- Pinehill Adventist Academy, Champhai

== Hospital ==
It currently operates Aizawl Adventist Hospital, and MED-AIM Adventist Hospital in Champhai.

== See also ==
- Seventh-day Adventist Church
- List of Christian denominations in North East India
- Seventh-day Adventist Church in India
