= Boro Baptist Church Association =

Baptist denomination

Boro Baptist Church Association (BBCA)
- Abbreviation: BBCA
- Classification: Evangelicalism
- Scripture: Bible
- Theology: Baptist
- Governance: Central Council
- President: Mr. Enosh Basumatary
- Associations: Baptist World Alliance
- Language: Boro, Santhali English
- Headquarters: Boro Baptist Church Association, P.O. Tukrajhar, 783394 District-Chirang, Assam, India
- Founder: American Baptist Missionaries
- Origin: 1927; 99 years ago
- Congregations: 219
- Members: above 40,000
- Hospitals: Crofts Memorial Hospital, Tukrajhar
- Primary schools: JD Williams HS School
- Tertiary institutions: Shalom Bible College
- Other name: Golpara Boro Baptist Church Union
- Publications: Jiu Dinga (Yearly)
- Official website: bbcatuk.net

The Boro Baptist Church Association (BBCA) is a Baptist Christian denomination in the state of Assam (Northeast India). Established in 1927 by the American Baptist Missionaries and later nurtured by Australian Baptist Missionary Society ABMS (now Global Interaction). The BBCA has its headquarters in the Tukrajhar Baptist Mission compound in Chirang district of Bodoland, Assam. BBCA is working in partnership with Baptist World Alliance, Global Interaction (Australia), Asia Pacific Baptist Federation, Seva Bharat, Missionaries Upholders Trust, Inspire India (Children Festival) and Tura Baptist Church.

== History ==
The origins of Boro Baptist Church Association are found in two important foreign missions - the American Baptist Mission and the Australian Baptist Missionary Society. The American Baptist missionary AJ Totle sent Umon K Marak, a Garo convert who preached the Gospel among the Boros of Tukrajhar area on the northern side of old Goalpara district, some 250 kilometers from Guwahati; Marak later founded the Goalpara Boro Baptist Church Union (now known as Boro Baptist Church Association) in 1927. However, the American Baptist Mission could not continue the mission work for a longer period of time due to shortage of workers and finally transferred it to the Australian Baptist Missionary Society (now known as Global Interaction) in 1946. The Australian Baptists began work among the Boros of Tukrajhar region from 1947, though the American Baptist Mission had transferred the Tukrajhar Mission station to the Australian Baptists in 1946. The first set of Australian Baptist missionaries Rev. Wilfred and Mrs. Gwenyth Crofts were sent to Tukrajhar on 17 May 1947, just three months before India received its independence.

The Australian Baptist Missionary Society continued their mission work among the Boros for twenty-one years. Since the year (1968), the leadership has been provided by the Boros themselves. The Boro Baptists rightly consider 1927 as the year of the beginning of Boro Baptist Church Association.

The missionary movement in Lower Assam was led by Boro Baptist Church Association especially from the 1980s when the great revival (spiritual awakening of the churches) came upon the churches of the Association. The immediate result of this was the formation of Gospel Fellowship in 1980 consisted of lay people who were committed to the preaching of the Gospel of Christ. Later Mission and Evangelism was started in 1991 to intensify the mission work. At present there 18 mission fields in various parts of both within and outside of Assam including some foreign countries where 36 missionaries/evangelists are found to be ministering among various people groups. It is evident that it continues to receive new baptized members from these mission fields and that it plans on sending more workers to those who have not been reached with the Gospel of Christ in various parts of this great land and even beyond. In this regard, BBCA has recently (2016) entered into partnership with UCPI (United Christian Prayer for India) to make mission works more intense.

Home Mission, began in 1991, and encouraged supporting the mission involvement of the member churches of the Boro Baptists. It mobilized the churches to be self-supporting through systematically giving tithes for mission works besides paying yearly budgets to the Association. At present there are 35 full-time workers in the Home Mission who are being kept busy ministering 195 churches/ congregations which are clubbed together in six major pastoral service areas. Besides looking after spiritual growth of the member churches, these Home Mission workers have administrative works as they are representatives of the Association to the churches in terms of proper co-ordination and supervision of various works.

Since inception, the Association has used education as central importance in its approach to the people. The American Baptist missionary Rev. AC Bowers and the Australian Baptist missionary Rev. PN Ewing contributed much to the Boro people through establishing schools. The Association continues to engage itself with school education - in this case JD Williams English School, established in 1984, promotes quality education including Christian education for all round development of the whole person and preparation of responsible citizens of the society and future leaders. Besides this, it has theological education, that is, Shalom Bible College, formed in 1998, imparting quality theological education to the students through offering M.Div., B.Th. and other degrees for the Lord's ministry.

Medical mission has been part of the Association's activities since the beginning. From the day of the pillbox ministry, which the early Australian Baptist missionaries carried out, the Association's Crofts Memorial Hospital has grown into a good hospital to be reckoned with, now. The Crofts Memorial Hospital, established in 1956 and named after the first ABMS missionaries Wilfred and Gwenyth Crofts, is now a self contained 15 bedded primary health facility rendering low cost, effective quality health care, health awareness and community service to all people irrespective of caste, creed and color presenting Christ through the healing ministry. In addition, the Association's Bethel Prayer Tower, established in 1998 provides another healing ministry through opening 24 hours for prayer by lay people who are committed to prayer and fasting praying sincerely for the sick and suffering irrespective of race, creed or class.

The Association's relief work goes back to the Australian Baptist missionaries who carried out Christian humanitarian works during rioting which took place in 1950. Later it actively provided relief services to the victims of 1996, 2011 and 2012 riots in Lower Assam. Through Swrang Family Development Project, begun in 2002 with the support of BWAA and Goalpara Integrated Community Development Project; started in 2005; with NEICORD's support; worked for development through empowering people/capacity building activities. The Association's Boro Baptist Aid & Development, established in 2009, serves as a channel for expressing Christian social concerns and alleviating human needs during times of sicknesses and natural calamities.

According to a census published by the association in 2023, it claimed 219 churches and fellowships with 18,000 plus baptized members.

== Location ==
Boro Baptist Church Association is located at Tukrajhar village of Chirang district, Assam at the foothills of Bhutan which is about 225 km away from the main city Guwahati (3½ hrs. by road) which is also known as the Gateway to the North East India and 28 km from the nearest railway station, New Bongaigaon and 26 km down south from the Kingdom of Bhutan. Tukrajhar is a rural but with good road connections in a very serene and quite place.

BBCA is spread across approximately 70 acres of greenery and elevated land. The Headquarters is highly eco-friendly, trees and shrubs provided natural park-like surroundings. BBCA is truly a pollution free and plastic free and an ideal place for Mission Headquarters.

== See also ==
- Baptists
- Boro Baptist Convention
- Baptist World Alliance
- Council of Baptist Churches in Northeast India
- Karbi-Anglong Baptist Convention
- List of Christian denominations in Northeast India
- Mising Baptist Kebang
- Rabha Baptist Church Union
