= Kohima Ao Baptist Church =

- Kohima Ao Baptist Arogo
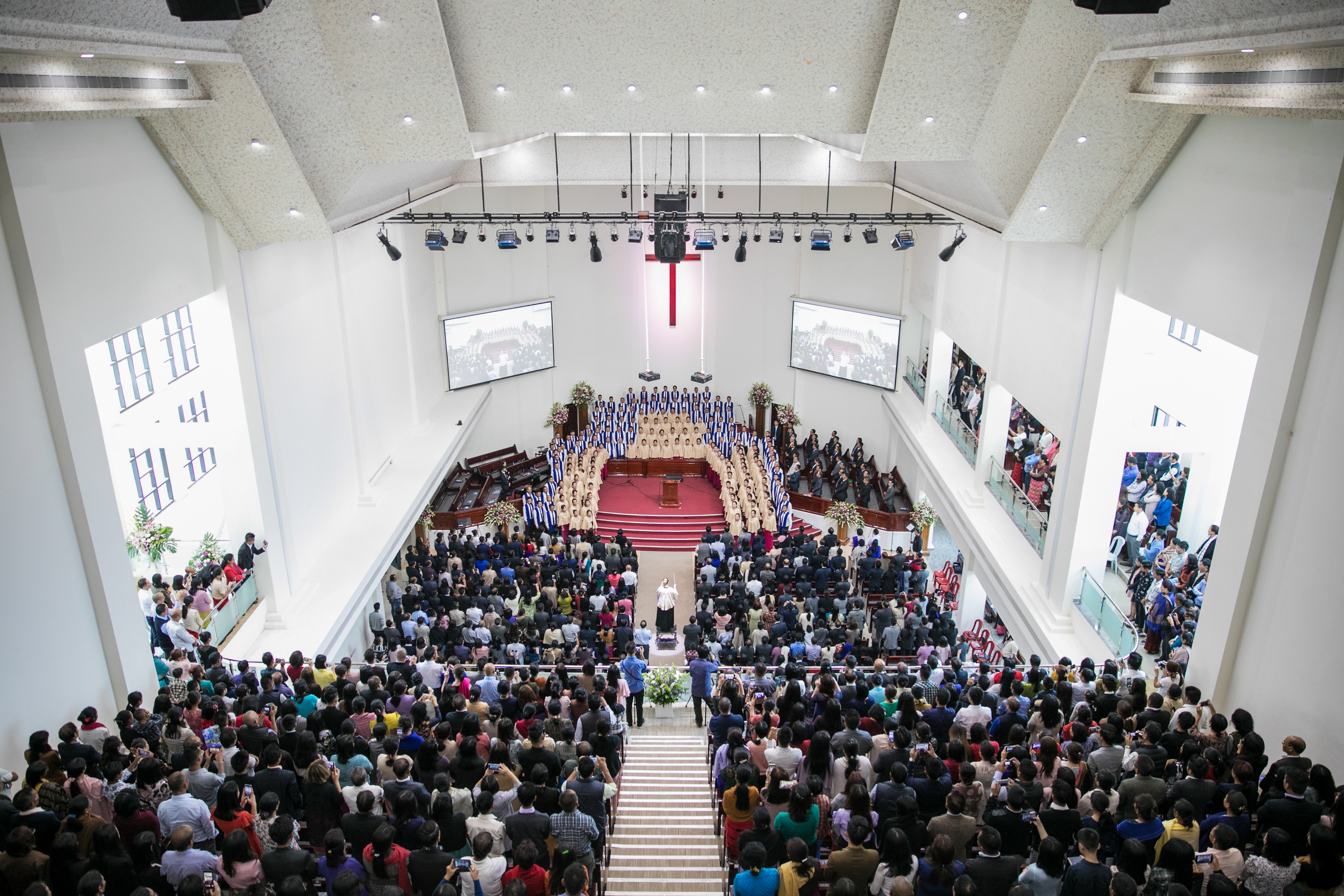
- Inauguration service of the new church building, 28 April 2019
- Kohima Ao Baptist Church
- 25.668942°N 94.106388°E
- Location: Midland Ward, Kohima, Nagaland
- Country: India
- Denomination: Baptist
- Website: kabaarogo.com

History
- Founded: 1939; 87 years ago
- Dedicated: 28 April 2019

Architecture
- Architect: Zynorique Consultant
- Years built: 2011–2019
- Groundbreaking: 11 October 2011
- Completed: April 2019

Kohima Ao Baptist Church is a Baptist church located in Midland Ward, Kohima, Nagaland, India affiliated with the Ao Baptist Arogo Mungdang. KABA was one of the first Ao churches established outside the Ao region. It serves as the main church building of the Ao Nagas residing in Kohima.

== History ==
The Kohima Ao Baptist Church was established in the year 1939 where 9 people from the Ao community started the Church in Kohima. Dismantling of the old church building began on 1 April 2011 and a new building was dedicated on 28 April 2019 by senior pastor Rev. M. Asangba Longkümer.

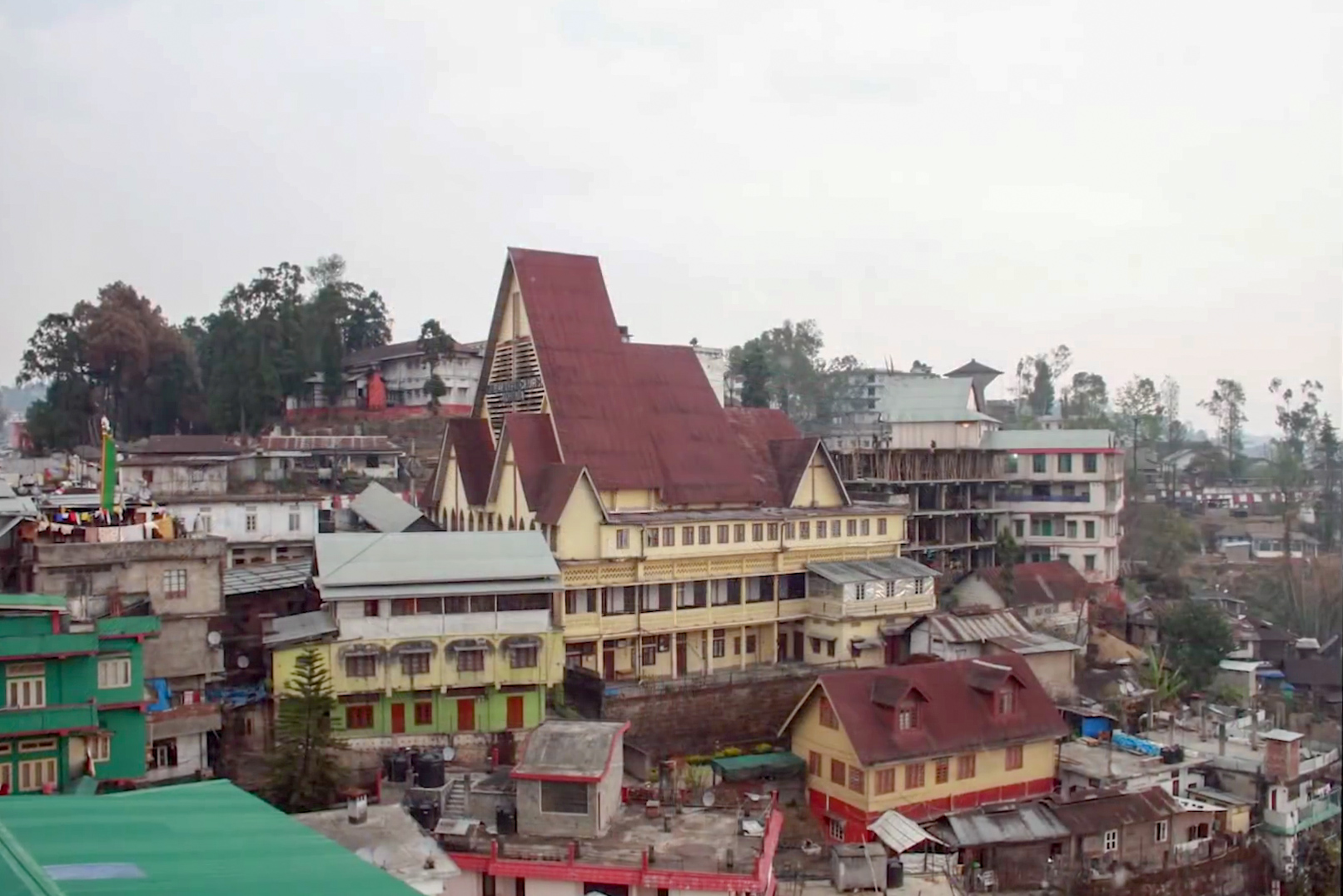
Old church building.

== Architecture ==
Located at Midland Ward, Kohima, the new church building was constructed at a cost of over ₹26 crore and has a seating capacity of 3500 including the balcony.

== Membership ==
Today the church membership has 3500 households and a total of 9000+ baptised members with several sectoral fellowships across the city.

== Gallery ==
Kohima Ao Baptist Arogo
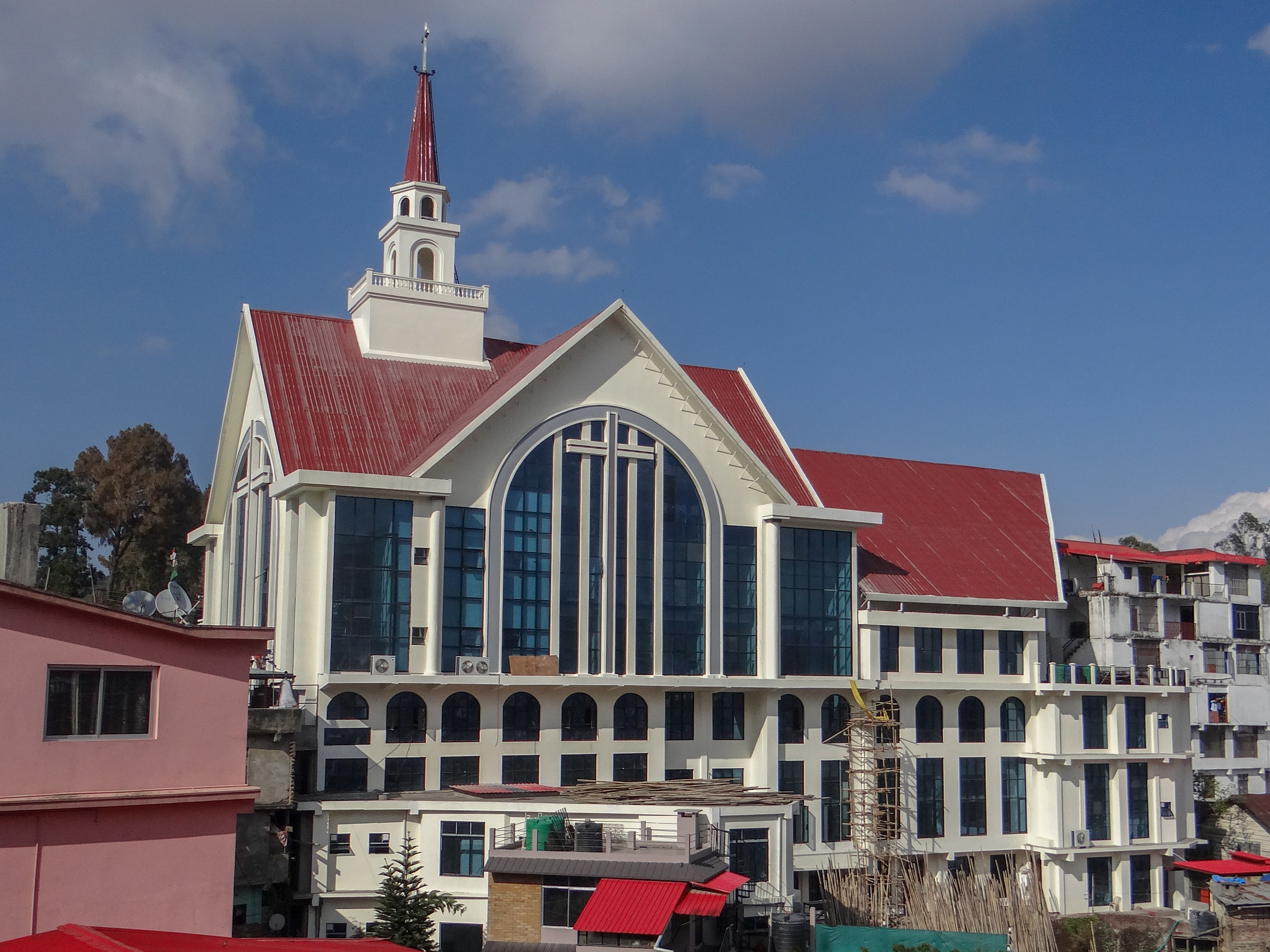
New building

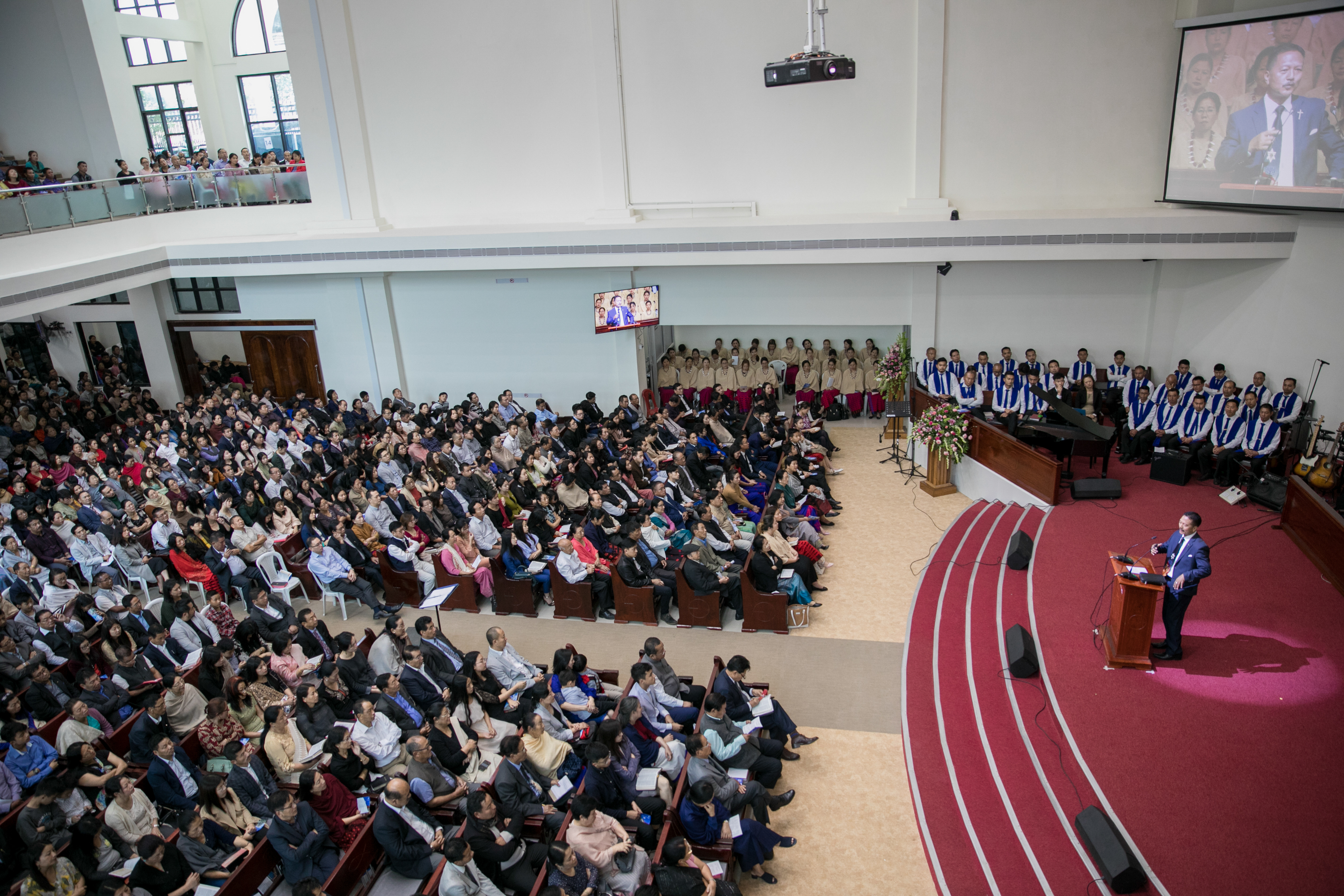
Side profile, 28 April 2019

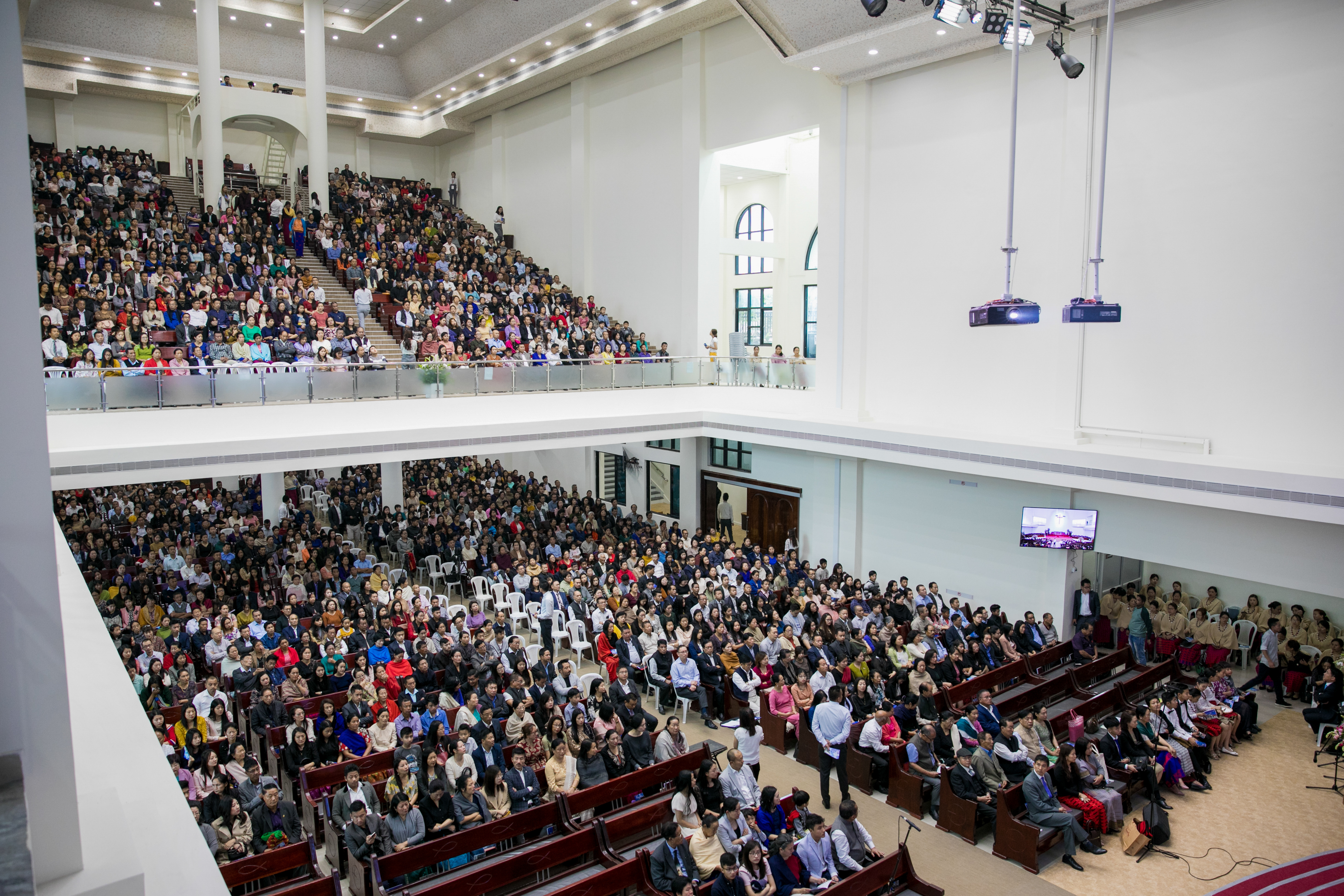
Front profile, 2019

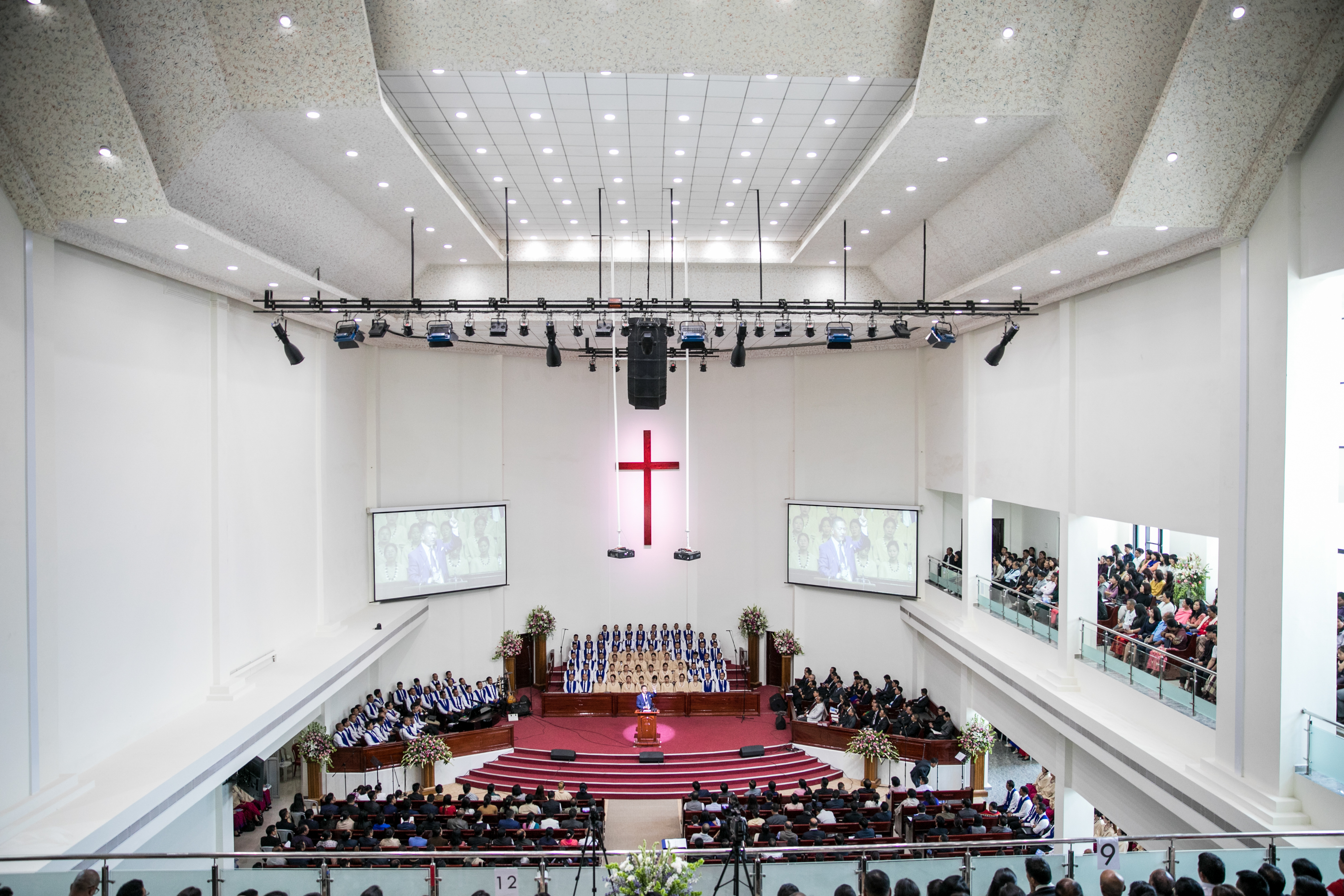
View from the back, 2019

== See also ==
- Ao Baptist Arogo Mungdang
- Christianity in Nagaland
