= Baptist Church of Mizoram =

Church in Mizoram, India

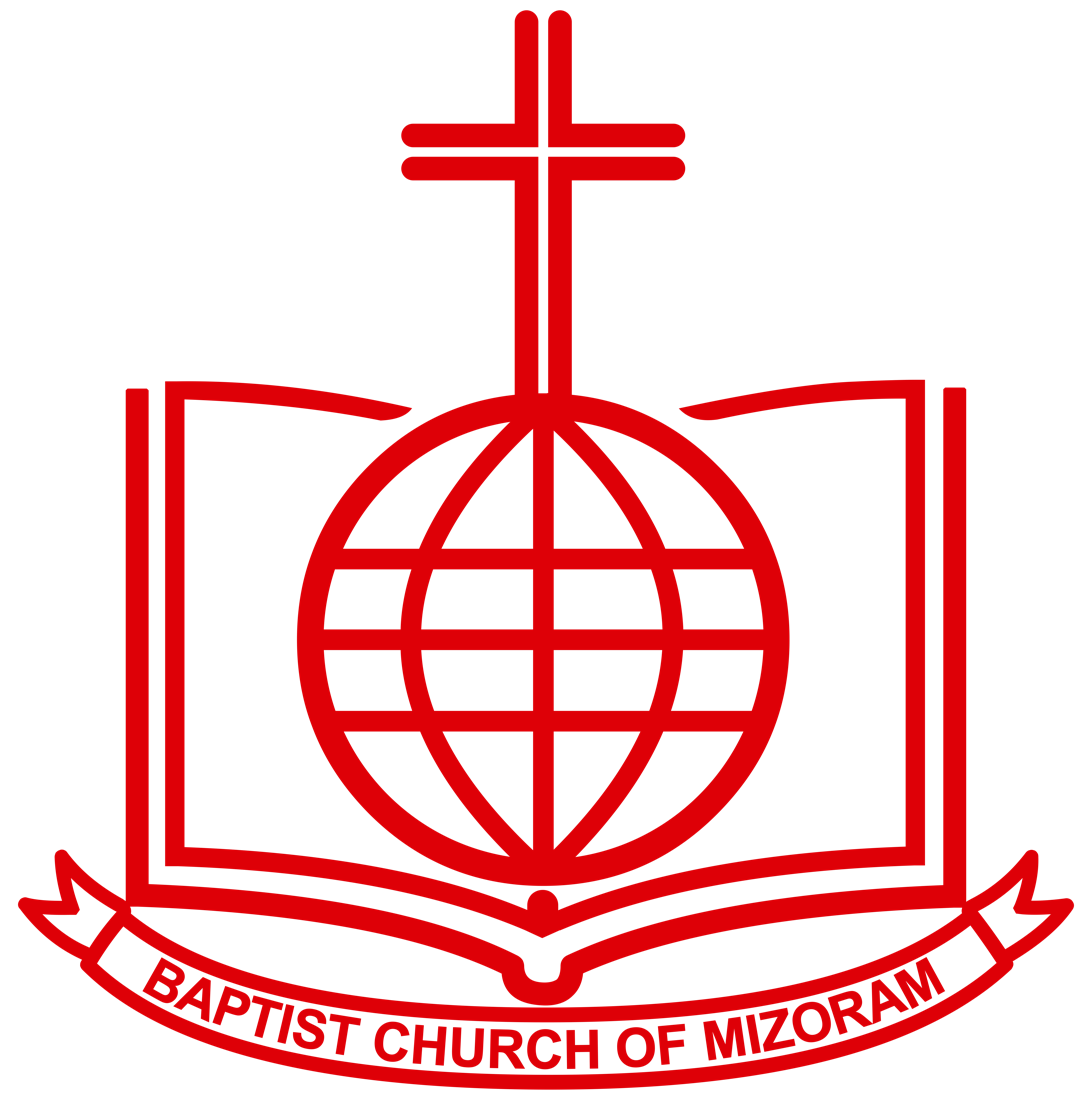
- Classification: Evangelicalism
- Orientation: Baptist
- President: Rev. Dr. C. Vanlaldika
- General Secretary: Rev. Dr. H. Lalthlamuana
- Associations: Baptist World Alliance
- Headquarters: Baptist Church of Mizoram Office, Serkawn, Lunglei, Mizoram, India
- Origin: 11 January 1894; 132 years ago Mizoram, India
- Congregations: 663
- Members: 122,072
- Official website: www.mizobaptist.org

Baptist Church of Mizoram is a Baptist Christian denomination in India. It is affiliated with the Baptist World Alliance. The headquarters is in Lunglei, Mizoram.

== History ==
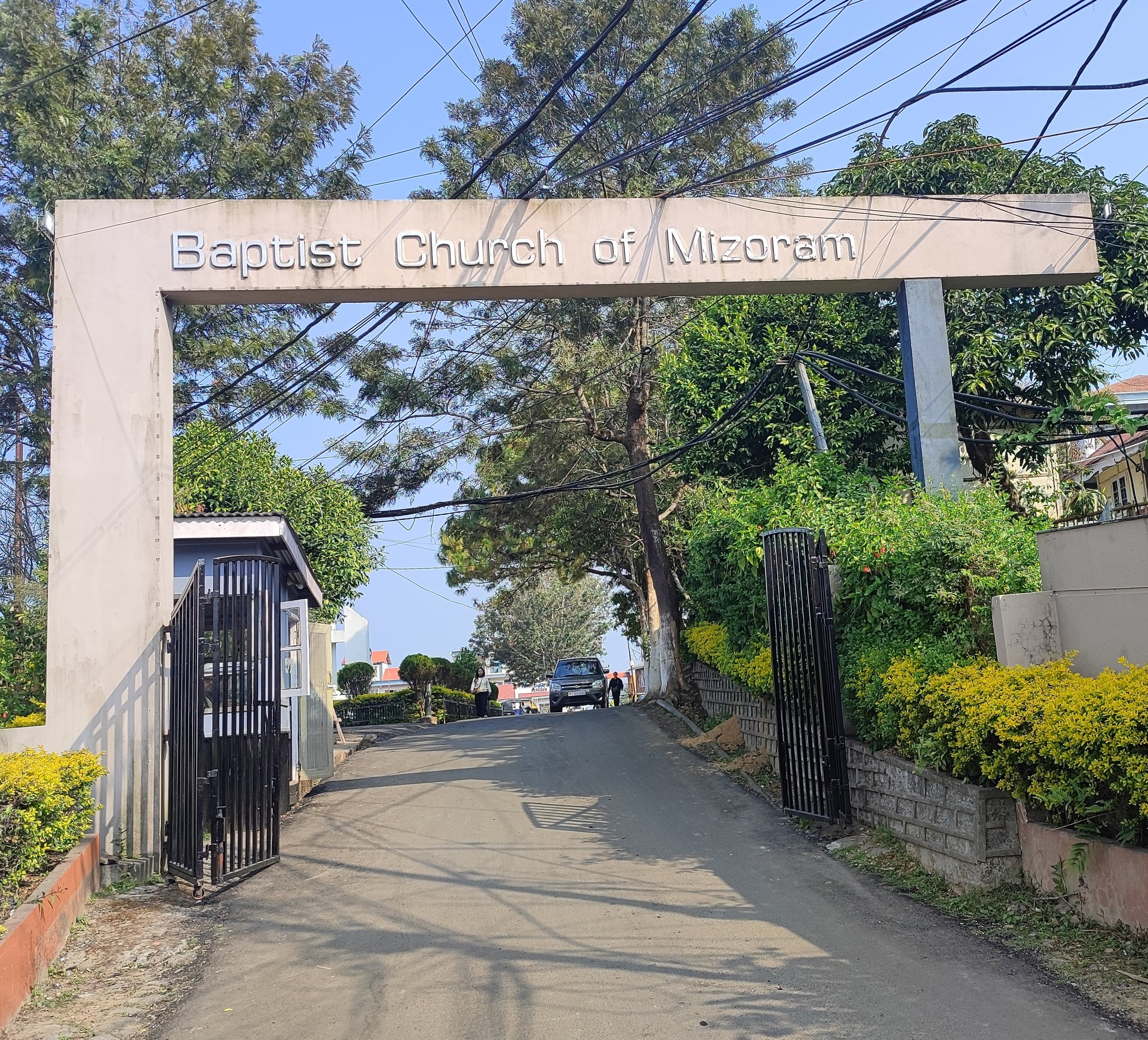
Baptist Church of Mizoram Campus entrance

The Baptist Church of Mizoram has its origins in an English Baptist mission established in 1894, by Frederick William Savidge and James Herbert Lorrain of the Baptist Missionary Society. In 1914, the first council of the Church was formed. In 2000, it founded the Academy of Integrated Christian Studies.

According to a census published by the association in 2023, it claimed 663 churches and 122,072 members.

== A concise account of Mission Department ==
A concise account of the BCM Mission works, as it stands for 46 years (1966 – 2012) from the inception of the BCM Mission Department as the Zoram Baptist Mission, can be made as follows:

=== Missionary personnel ===
ZBM started cross-culture missionary work, employing only two full-time missionaries in 1939. Now, (in 2012) BCM Mission Committee has more than 800 mission workers including missionaries.

=== Mission fields and stations ===
BCM Mission Committee has 23 mission fields including mission stations in different parts of India and works in partnership with other mission agencies outside India.

=== Mission fund ===
The ZBM (as its previous name) had only Rs. 12.50p (Rupees twelve and fifty paisa) in its initial stage. Now the BCM Mission budget of 2012 - 2013 has grown to Rs.11, 79, 78,000.00(Rupees eleven crore seventy-nine lakhs and seventy-eight thousand).

=== Schools and students ===
At present Mission Committee runs 54 mission schools within and outside Mizoram, of which 10 are High Schools, 5 Middle Schools, 39 Primary Schools and having around 6500 students.

== Affiliation ==
BCM is a member of the Baptist World Alliance.

== Education ==
=== Academy of Integrated Christian Studies ===
Academy of Integrated Christian Studies
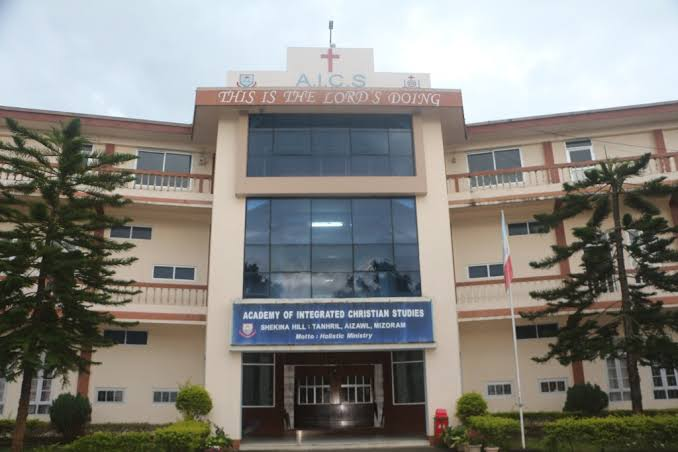
- Established: 2000; 26 years ago
- Affiliations: Senate of Serampore College (University), Baptist Church of Mizoram
- Principal: Rev. Dr. Vanlalchhawna Khiangte
- Location: Aizawl, Mizoram, India
- Campus: Urban
- Website: aics.edu.in

Academy of Integrated Christian Studies (AICS) is a Christian college situated in Aizawl, Mizoram, affiliated to the Senate of Serampore College (University). It was established by the church under the leadership of Dr. R.L. Hnuni in 2000, and uses English as an instruction medium. It aims to provides a holistic theological education to baptists of Northeastern India. This institution offers several programs such as Theological Training, Missionary Training, Ministerial Training, Music Training and Research and Development. The institution is located in 'Shekina Hill.

==== R. L. Hnuni ====
R. L. Hnuni is the founding principal of the academy, and an author of theological and feminist works. In 2011, Hnuni was recommended by the pastoral committee of the church to become the first ordained female pastor in the state. Gowever, The BCM assembly, then rejected this recommendation in January 2011. The women's wing of the Mizoram Presbyterian Church Synod separately passed a resolution supporting her ordination around the same time.

Following a second recommendation, the BCM assembly accepted the proposal, and on 11 March 2012 Hnuni was ordained by Rev. Raltawnga, becoming the first woman ordained by any Christian denomination in Mizoram. However, church leaders indicated she would not be assigned an independent parish as male priests are.

=== Baptist Higher Secondary School (BHSS) ===
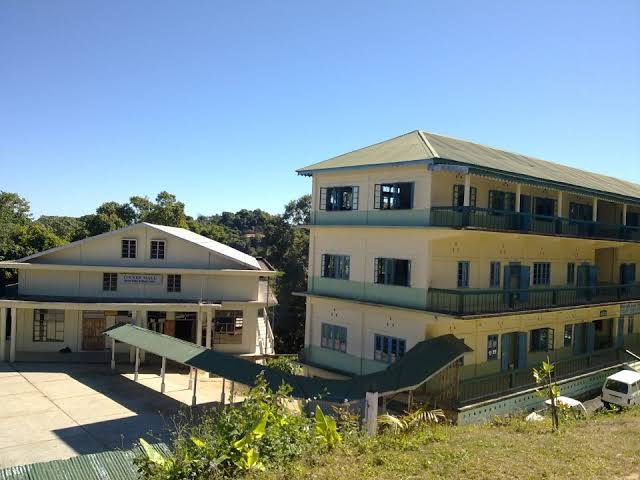
Baptist Higher Secondary School, Serkawn

Baptist Higher Secondary School is a school owned by Baptist Church of Mizoram. The school enrolls students for Secondary and Higher Secondary levels. The current Principal of Baptist Higher Secondary School is Pu. C. Lalhmingmuana

The school has three hostels, one for Junior section, the Girls’ hostel and one for the boys. The over all administration is run by the Principal with the help of the two Vice Principals. The over all strength of the staff is around 80 in number. The school's motto is "The Utmost for the Highest".

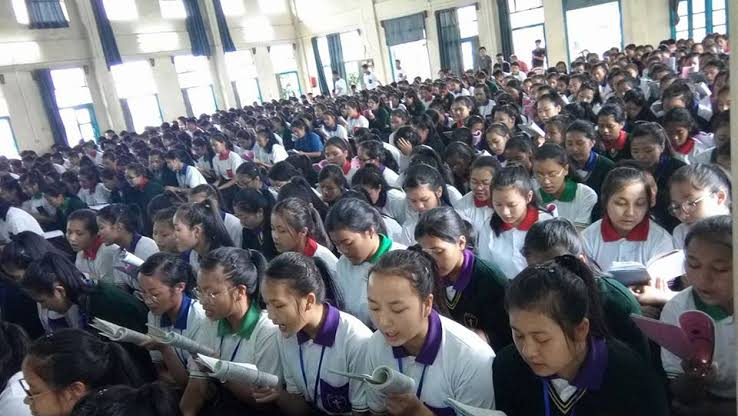
Students gathering for a devotion

Baptist Church of Mizoram expanded the school into lower classes including Nursery to Middle Schools by merging with co-existing school called Baptist English School, thus, from 2005 it is known as Baptist Higher Secondary School Junior Section. It enrolls a number of 1,070 students in the 2019-20 Academic Session with 43 Teaching Staffs.

=== Higher and Technical Institute of Mizoram (HATIM) ===
HATIM is the first Christian residential co-educational college in Mizoram, India, and is located in Lunglei.

=== Nursing College ===
The Baptist church of Mizoram has a nursing college operated under the Serkawn hospital and runs GNM course. It has intake of 20 nurses per year at present.

== See also ==
- Christianity in Mizoram
- Council of Baptist Churches in Northeast India
- North East India Christian Council
- List of Christian denominations in North East India
