= Arunachal Baptist Church Council =

Baptist church association in India

- Abbreviation: ABCC
- Classification: Evangelicalism
- Theology: Baptist
- Associations: Council of Baptist Churches in Northeast India, Baptist World Alliance
- Headquarters: Naharlagun, India
- Congregations: 1,141
- Members: 132,787
- Official website: abccindia.org

The Arunachal Baptist Church Council (ABCC) is a Baptist Christian denomination in the state of Arunachal Pradesh in North East India. ABCC is led by Mr. John Padung, President, and Rev. Adv. Tugaso Manyu, General Secretary. The convention has its office at Naharlagun, Papum Pare District. It is affiliated with the Council of Baptist Churches in Northeast India and the Asia Pacific Baptist Federation (Baptist World Alliance).

== Statistics ==
According to a census published by the association in 2023, it claimed 132,787 baptized members in 1,141 churches and 30 Fellowships under 20 Baptist member associations / Councils in 2022.

The number of churches and baptized members of Constituent member associations/ councils of ABCC as on 2020:

Communicant members including children and non-baptized family members are not included in the statistics.

Sl. No.	Association	Churches	Members
1.	Adi Baptist Churches Association (ABCA)	45	2,430
2.	Adi Baptist Council (ABC)	33+2	3,200
3.	Adi Baptist Union (ABU)	95	7,300
4.	Apatani Baptist Association (ABA)	15+5	3,814
5.	Council of Lirabo Baptist Churches (CLBC)	5	200
6.	Dibang Lohit Baptist Churches Association (DLBCA)	46+11	4,875
7.	Galo Baptist Church Council (GBCC)	75	4,800
8.	Galo Baptist Union (GBU)	35	4,600
9.	Hewa Baptist Church Association (HBCA)	18	1,160
10.	Idu Mishmi Baptist Khumu Embo (IMBKE)	13	620
11.	Mishmi Baptist Church Council (MBCC)	30	3,515
12.	Nokte Baptist Asathem Roapkkhoan (NBAR earlier known as NBCA)	55	7,000
13.	Nyishi Baptist Church Council (NBCC)	468	60,000
14.	Tagin Baptist Churches Association (TBCA)	14	1,220
15.	Tangsa Baptist Churches Association (TBCA)	101+8	16,840
16.	Tutsa Baptist Church Council (TBCC)	36	6,744
17.	Upper Subansiri Baptist Churches Association (USBCA)	11	515
18.	Wancho Baptist Churches Association (WBCA)	69	16,715
19.	West Kameng Baptist Churches Council (WKBCC)	19+4	1,600
20.	Olo Baptist Church Association (OBCA)	13	1,295
	Total	1196+30	1,48,443

== See also ==
- Council of Baptist Churches in Northeast India
- North East India Christian Council
- Christianity in Arunachal Pradesh
- List of Christian denominations in North East India
