= List of Christian denominations in Northeast India =

The following shows the Christian denominations present in Northeast India, along with number of churches and approximate number of Church members.

Major Christian Denominations
Denomination	Churches	Members
Baptist	12,257	2,094,994
Catholic	533	1,950,594
Presbyterian	4,013	1,576,830

== Anglican ==
- Church of North India (CNI)
  - Diocese of Northeast India (275) 50,000
- Church of South India

== Baptist ==
Note: The membership for Baptist churches mostly denote the adult baptized members of Churches and therefore do not include non-baptized family members as per Baptist Church Doctrine and beliefs.

- Baptist Church of Mizoram (680) 176,404
- Boro Baptist Church Association (219) 47,000
- Council of Baptist Churches in Northeast India (CBCNEI)
  - Arunachal Baptist Church Council (1,201) 148,443
  - Assam Baptist Convention (921) 37,410
  - Garo Baptist Convention (2,622) 361,378
  - Karbi-Anglong Baptist Convention (354) 39,174
  - Manipur Baptist Convention (1,501) 2,21,409
    - Kuki Baptist Convention 28,431 Baptized members in 2018
  - Mising Baptist Kebang (115) 4,300
  - Nagaland Baptist Church Council (1,708) 722,872
    - Angami Baptist Church Council
    - Ao Baptist Arogo Mungdang
- Evangelical Baptist Convention (209) 41,493
- Lairam Jesus Christ Baptist Church (118) 23,392
- Lower Assam Baptist Union (335) 38,088
- New Testament Baptist Churches Association (29) 10,000
- North Bank Baptist Christian Association (1,238) 126,480
  - Boro Baptist Convention (354) 52,000
- Rabha Baptist Convention (64) 12,356
- Tripura Baptist Christian Union (943) 84,795

== Catholic ==
The Catholic Church in North East India falls under three different sui iuris churches, all three are in full communion with each other and with the Pope. These include the Latin Church, Syro-Malabar Church, Syro-Malankara Catholic Church.

1) Latin Church

The total number of Latin Catholics in North East India as of 2020 stands at 1,913,431 adherents where the region is divided into 3 Metropolitan Archdioceses and 12 suffragan dioceses with a total of 528 parishes and more than 3500 chapels/mission stations/local churches and congregations as per the statistics mentioned below.

Note: The brackets denote the number of Catholic Church parishes

- Metropolitan of Guwahati:
  - Archdiocese of Guwahati (46) 58,420
  - Diocese of Bongaigaon (36) 73,800
  - Diocese of Dibrugarh (37) 135,903
  - Diocese of Diphu (26) 70,386
  - Diocese of Tezpur (33) 193,242
  - Diocese of Itanagar (42) 86,800
  - Diocese of Miao (30) 98,945
- Metropolitan of Shillong
  - Archdiocese of Shillong (43) 347,344
  - Diocese of Nongstoin (22) 174,072
  - Diocese of Jowai (18) 114,000
  - Diocese of Tura (45) 340,175
  - Diocese of Agartala (21) 51,111
  - Diocese of Aizawl (32) 40,000
- Metropolitan of Imphal:
  - Archdiocese of Imphal (53) 104,257
  - Diocese of Kohima (52) 62,329
- Although geographically Sikkim is part of North East India. The state of Sikkim falls under the Roman Catholic Diocese of Darjeeling with 60 parishes and 39,730 Catholics. This diocese fall under the province of the Archdiocese of Calcutta and ecclesiastically not included in the North Eastern region of India.

- (2) Syro-Malabar Church Mission to the North East:

With the decision of the synod of bishops of the Syro-Malabar Catholic Church and under the guidance of Mar Raphael Thattil, the Syro Malabar Bishop of Shamshabad, a delegation made a visit to the North -Eastern States of Tripura, Assam, Meghalaya, Arunachal Pradesh from 7 May to 18 May 2019. On the basis of this visit and after much prayers, reflections and discussions together with the guidance of the Major Archbishop of Syro-Malabar Church Archbishop Mar George Alenchery, the Bishops took the decision to start the evangelical mission of the Syro Malabar Church in Northeast India. Thus the Eparchy of Irinjalakuda was invited to start a mission in the Northeast. The Bishop of Irinjalakuda accepted the Divine invitation and started the Silchar Syro-Malabar Catholic Mission - in short Silchar Mission - with St. Paul the Apostole of the Gentiles as the Heavenly Patron. On the day of the feast of the Assumption of Our Lady, 15 August 2019, the first mission house and chapel dedicated to the Most Sacred Heart of Jesus were blessed at Silchar and the solemn Holy Qurbana was offered.

- (3) Syro-Malankara Church mission to the North East:

Pope Francis, on 26 March 2015 by the Decree N 7780/15 also erected the St. John Chrysostom Diocese for the Syro-Malankara Catholic Church which include the North Eastern region of India. The mission to North East India is presently under the care of Rev. Fr. Jigmy Thomas, Rev. Fr. Justin Raj R. and Rev. Fr. Sabi Varghese.

== Congregational ==
- Kuki Christian Church (312) 38,600
- Evangelical Congregational Church of India (520) 72,500
- Evangelical Free Church of India (293) 67,401
- Independent Church of India (182) 65,027
- Evangelical Church of Maraland (85) 33,000

== Lutheran ==
- Northern Evangelical Lutheran Church (180) 87,541
- Evangelical Lutheran Church in the Himalayan States 24,750
  - Bodo Evangelical Lutheran Church (65) 11,510
- Gossner Evangelical Lutheran Church in Chotanagpur and Assam
- Manipur Evangelical Lutheran Church (49) 8,500

== Methodist ==
- Methodist Church in India
  - Methodist Mission Church in North East India (MMC NEI)
- Wesleyan Methodist Church of East India (Wesleyan Church)
  - Mizoram Wesleyan Methodist Church

== Christian Revival Church ==
- Christian Revival Church
  - Nagaland Christian Revival Church (1,195) 355,000
  - Arunachal Pradesh Christian Revival Church Council (APCRCC)
  - Christian Revival Church Assam
  - Christian Revival Church Manipur
  - Christian Revival Church Meghalaya
  - Christian Revival Church Sikkim
  - Christian Revival Church Tripura
  - Christian Revival Church West Bengal
- Church of God, Meghalaya and Assam (563) 100,000
- United Pentecostal Church, North East India (UPCNEI) 91,720
- United Pentecostal Church (Mizoram) 41,558
- Assembly Church of Jesus Christ Full Gospel (300) 40,000
- Isua Krista Kohhran
- Nagaland Pentecostal Church (NPC)
- Assembly of God
- Indian Pentecostal Church of God
- The Pentecostal Mission

== Presbyterian ==
The Presbyterian Church of India consists of the following synods with 4,616 churches and 1,467,529 members as of 2018:

- Biateram Presbyterian Synod 16,953
- Cachar Hill Tribes Presbyterian Synod 34,153
- Karbi Anglong Presbyterian Church Synod (62) 22,952
- Khasi Jaintia Presbyterian Synod Mihngi (576) 294,320
- Khasi Jaintia Presbyterian Synod Sepngi (854) 370,764
- Manipur Presbyterian Church Synod (110) 15,571
- Meitei Presbyterian Singlup Synod (85) 8,785
- Mizoram Presbyterian Synod (1,266) 611,241
- Ri Bhoi Presbyterian Synod 70,013
- Tripura Presbyterian Church Synod (325) 22,277
- Zou Presbyterian Synod (68) 11,768

== Seventh-day Adventist ==
- The Northeast Indian Union of Seventh-day Adventist has 220 Churches and 53,226 members and comprises the following:
- Mizo Conference of Seventh-day Adventist (81) 22,446
- Khasi Jaintia Conference (28) 5,426
- Manipur Conference (46) 6,644
- Garo Section (43) 11,960
- Arunachal Pradesh Region (1) 367
- Assam Region (18) 5,594
- Nagaland Region (3) 789
- Tripura Region

== Others ==
- The Salvation Army 55,791
- Unitarian Union of North East India 10,000
- Holy Christ Church North east India (1500)
- Believers Eastern Church

== See also ==
- Baptist World Alliance
- List of Christian denominations in India
- List of Roman Catholic dioceses in India
- North East India Christian Council
- Bible translations into the languages of Northeast India
- Presbyterian Church of India
- Christian Revival Church
- Christianity in India
