= Christian Revival Church =

Christian church denomination

The Christian Revival Church is a Full Gospel, Evangelical, Pentecostal and Charismatic Christian denomination in India.

== History ==
The CRC was started at Gariphema Village, Nagaland, India on 9 January 1962 as Christian Revival Church (CRC) by Revelation of God, given by Holy Spirit. It spread to different part of Indian states; like- Arunachal Pradesh, began in 1984 & born as Arunachal Pradesh Christian Revival Church Council (APCRCC) on 24.12.1987 at Naharlagun, Assam, Manipur, Meghalaya, Sikkim, West Bengal, Tamil Nadu, Maharashtra, Bihar, Uttarakhand, Odisha & Uttar Pradesh and to other Nations or different countries; like, Myanmar, Nepal, Thailand.

The Christian Revival Church is Internationally identified as Christian Revival Church International Association (CRCIA).

== Beliefs ==
This church believes in baptism by immersion, tithing for prosperity, speaking in other tongues as evidence of baptism in the Holy Spirit, casting out demons, fasting, divine healing, rapture of the church, and millennialism.

== Churches ==
- Nagaland Christian Revival Church (1,195) 355,000
- Arunachal Pradesh Christian Revival Church Council
- Christian Revival Church Assam (ACRC)
- Christian Revival Church Manipur (Manipur CRC)
- Christian Revival Church Meghalaya (MCRC)
- Christian Revival Church Sikkim (SCRC)
- Christian Revival Church Tripura (TCRC)
- Christian Revival Church West Bengal (WBCRC)
- Christian Revival Church New Delhi
- Christian Revival Church Bihar
- Christian Revival Church Odisha
- Christian Revival Church Uttarakhand (UCRC)
- Uttar Pradesh Christian Revival Church (UPCRC)
- Christian Revival Church Tamil Nadu

== See also ==
- List of Christian denominations in North East India
- Christianity in Arunachal Pradesh
- Christianity in India
