= North Bank Baptist Christian Association =

Baptist Christian denomination in India

North Bank Baptist Christian Association is a Baptist Christian denomination in India. It is headquartered in Shakomato Christian Center, Biswanath Chariali, Sonitpur District of Assam.

== History ==
It was established in the year 1950. According to a census published by the association in 2023, it claimed 1,136 congregations and 88,976 members. It is affiliated to the Baptist World Alliance.

The following Baptist associations are its constituent bodies:

- Boro Baptist Convention
- Nyishi Baptist Church Council
- Adi Baptist Union
- Sonitpur Baptist Christian Association
- Lakhimpur Baptist Christian Association
- Apatani Baptist Association
- Dhemaji Mishing Baptist Association
- Dhemaji Baptist Christian Association

== See also ==
- Council of Baptist Churches in Northeast India
- List of Christian denominations in North East India
