= Trinity Theological College, Dimapur =

Coordinates: 25.881452°N 93.712886°E

Trinity Theological College

Location
- Thahekhü; Dimapur; India

Information
- Type: Theological College
- Established: 1992; 34 years ago
- Founder: Sümi Baptist Convention
- Principal: Rev. Dr. Kavito Zhimo
- Gender: Co-Education
- Classes offered: Bachelor of Divinity
- Language: English
- Campus: Urban
- Affiliation: Senate of Serampore College (University), Nagaland Baptist Church Council
- Website: http://www.ttcedu.org/

Trinity Theological College is a Baptist theological institute in Thahekhü, Dimapur, Nagaland, India. It is affiliated with the Nagaland Baptist Church Council.

== History ==
Trinity Theological College was founded on 14 November 1992. The college was temporarily shifted from the original intended place to WSBAK mission centre where the first college session commenced on 10 July 1993. Later, in 1997 the college shifted to its present permanent location on the land donated by Thahekhu Village, Dimapur.

== Affiliations and Association ==
The College is registered with the Government of Nagaland as an educational institution since 1993 with an approved constitution. The same year the college was approved by Higher and Technical Education Nagaland, Kohima.

TTC is also a recognized institution of the Nagaland Baptist Church Council (NBCC) and Council of Baptist Churches of North East India (CBCNEI). The college is granted affiliation by the Senate of Serampore University to offer B.Th degree (1996) and B.D. Degree (2006). However under the new regulation of the Senate of Serampore College University, the college has now phased out the B. Th. program and offers only the B.D program. Trinity Theological College is sponsored by Sumi Baptist Convention (SBC).

== Location ==
Trinity Theological College is located at Thahekhu village, Dimapur. It is 5 kilometers drive from the City of Dimapur.

== Courses Offered ==
- Bachelor of Divinity
- Master of Theology
