= Assam Baptist Convention =

Baptist Christian denomination in Assam, India

Assam Baptist Convention (ABC) is a Baptist Christian denomination in Assam, India. It is affiliated with the Council of Baptist Churches in Northeast India and the Asia Pacific Baptist Federation (Baptist World Alliance).

== History ==
The Assam Baptist Convention traces its origins back to the work of 19th Century Baptists missionaries in Assam such as Krishna Chandra Pal, Nathan Brown, Oliver Cutter and Miles Bronson. The first indigenous person from Assam to be baptized into the baptist faith was Nidhi Levi from the Jalia Kaibarta ethnicity baptized in 1841. The Baptist Church of Assam was formed in 1845 with its headquarters at Guwahati. There was a small revival in Nidhi in 1847, but as of 1861 the Assam Baptist Church had only 31 members.

According to a census published by the association in 2023, it claimed 37,410 members and 921 churches.

== Schools ==
The Assam Baptist Convention currently operates a school in Nagaon and another in Golaghat.

== See also ==
- Council of Baptist Churches in Northeast India
- North East India Christian Council
- List of Christian denominations in North East India
