= Bodo Evangelical Lutheran Church =

Protestant denomination in Assam, India

- Classification: Lutheran
- Leader: Rt. Rev. Bishop Ichahak Mochahary
- Region: India
- Headquarters: Udalguri district, Assam
- Congregations: 71
- Members: 11,510
- Ministers: 11 Ordained Ministers

The Bodo Evangelical Lutheran Church is a Lutheran church made up of Bodo people, one of the ethnic groups of Assam, India. It is headquartered in Udalguri district in Assam. The church has 72 congregations in 6 pastorates and membership of 11,712 with 72 native workers and 3 schools.

It is one of the three major Lutheran denominations of northeast India along with the Gossner Evangelical Lutheran Church and the Northern Evangelical Lutheran Church.
