= Garo Baptist Convention =

Baptist Christian denomination in India

- Garo Baptist Convention (GBC), Birishiri, Durgapur, Netrokona
- Abbreviation: GBC
- Classification: Evangelicalism
- Theology: Baptist
- President: Mr. Sundar A Sangma
- General Secretary: Rev Janang R. Sangma
- Associations: Council of Baptist Churches in Northeast India, Baptist World Alliance
- Region: Meghalaya, Assam, Bangladesh
- Language: Garo
- Headquarters: Tura, India
- Founder: American Baptist Foreign Mission Society
- Origin: 1874; 152 years ago
- Congregations: 2,619
- Members: 333,908

Garo Baptist Convention is a Baptist Christian denomination of India and Bangladesh. It is named after the ethnic group of the name Garo. Most members of this church are in Meghalaya. In Bangladesh the central office of the GBC is located in Birishiri under the Durgapur Upazila of Netrokona District. It is affiliated with the Council of Baptist Churches in Northeast India and the Asia Pacific Baptist Federation (Baptist World Alliance).

== History ==
It was established in the year of 1881, though it started working in that area in 1874.

== Memberships ==
According to a census published by the association in 2023, it claimed 2,619 churches and 333,908 baptized members.

== Schools ==
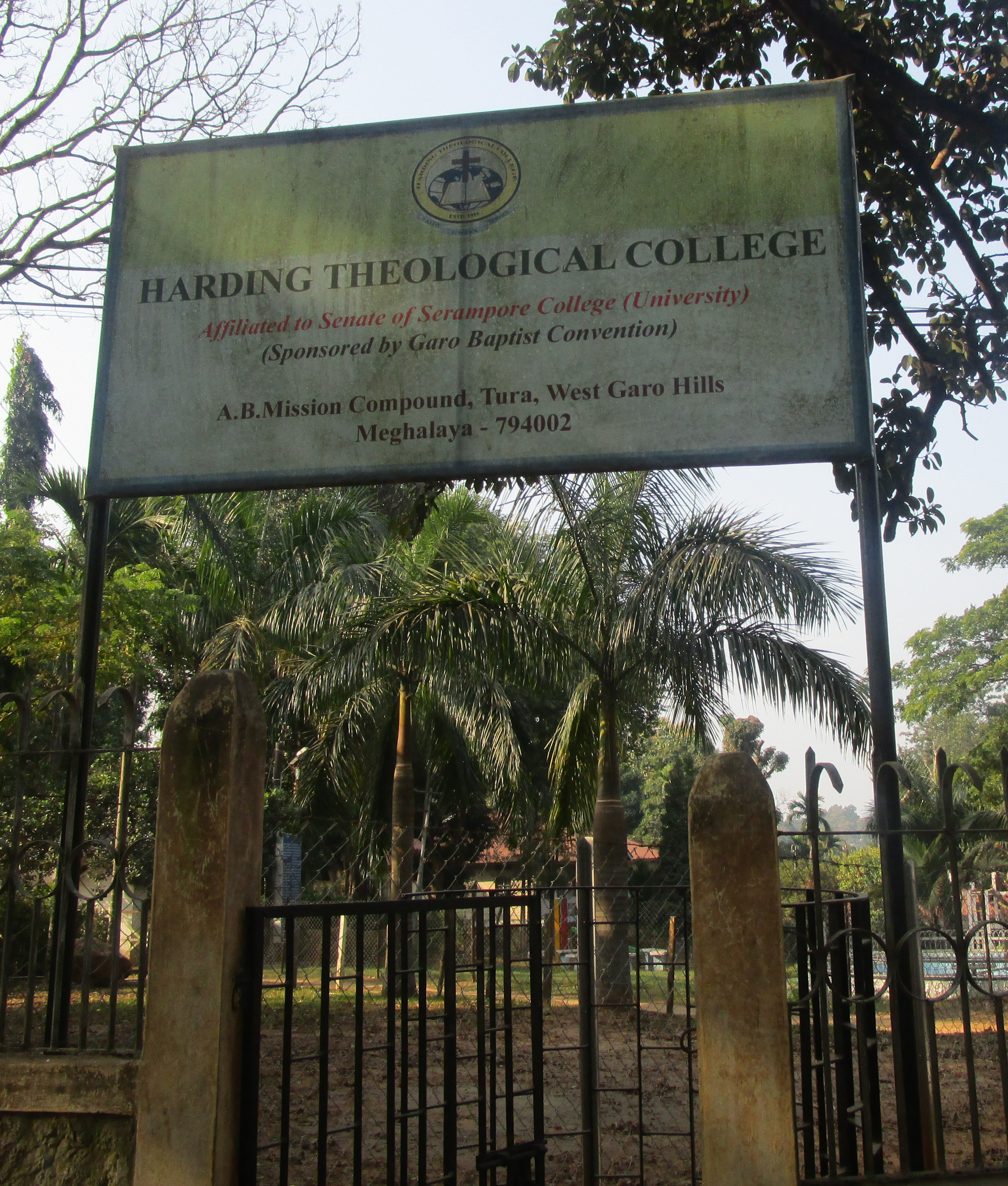
Harding Theological College at Tura, Meghalaya

GBC runs the Harding Theological College in Tura, Meghalaya. GBC also runs the J.N.B. Memorial Baptist Training Institute in Birishiri, Netrokona, Bangladesh.

== See also ==
- Council of Baptist Churches in Northeast India
- North East India Christian Council
- List of Christian denominations in North East India
- Bible
- Born again
- Jesus Christ
- Believers' Church
