= Baptist Union of North India =

Christian denomination

The Baptist Union of North India
- Company type: Religious organization
- Founded: 1948
- Headquarters: Delhi, India
- Members: 15,700 (2023)
- Parent: Baptist World Alliance
- Website: Official website

The Baptist Union of North India, also known as BUNI, is a Baptist Christian denomination in India. It is affiliated with the Baptist World Alliance, and its headquarters are in Delhi, India.

== History ==
The convention was officially founded in 1948. According to a census published by the association in 2023, it claims 15,700 members and 54 churches.

BUNI runs several non-profitable institutions, schools, and charitable hospitals in North India.
