= Nagaland Baptist Church Council =

Baptist Christian denomination

- Abbreviation: NBCC
- Classification: Evangelicalism
- Theology: Baptist
- General Secretary: Mar Pongener
- President: Achu Chang
- Associations: Council of Baptist Churches in Northeast India, Baptist World Alliance
- Headquarters: Kohima, Nagaland, India
- Founder: American Baptist Foreign Mission Society
- Origin: 1937; 89 years ago
- Congregations: 1,724
- Members: 716,495
- Ministers: 773
- Seminaries: 2
- Official website: nbcc-nagaland.org

The Nagaland Baptist Church Council is a Baptist Christian denomination based in Nagaland, India. It is affiliated with the Council of Baptist Churches in Northeast India and the Asia Pacific Baptist Federation (Baptist World Alliance). The headquarters is located in Kohima, the capital of Nagaland.

== History ==
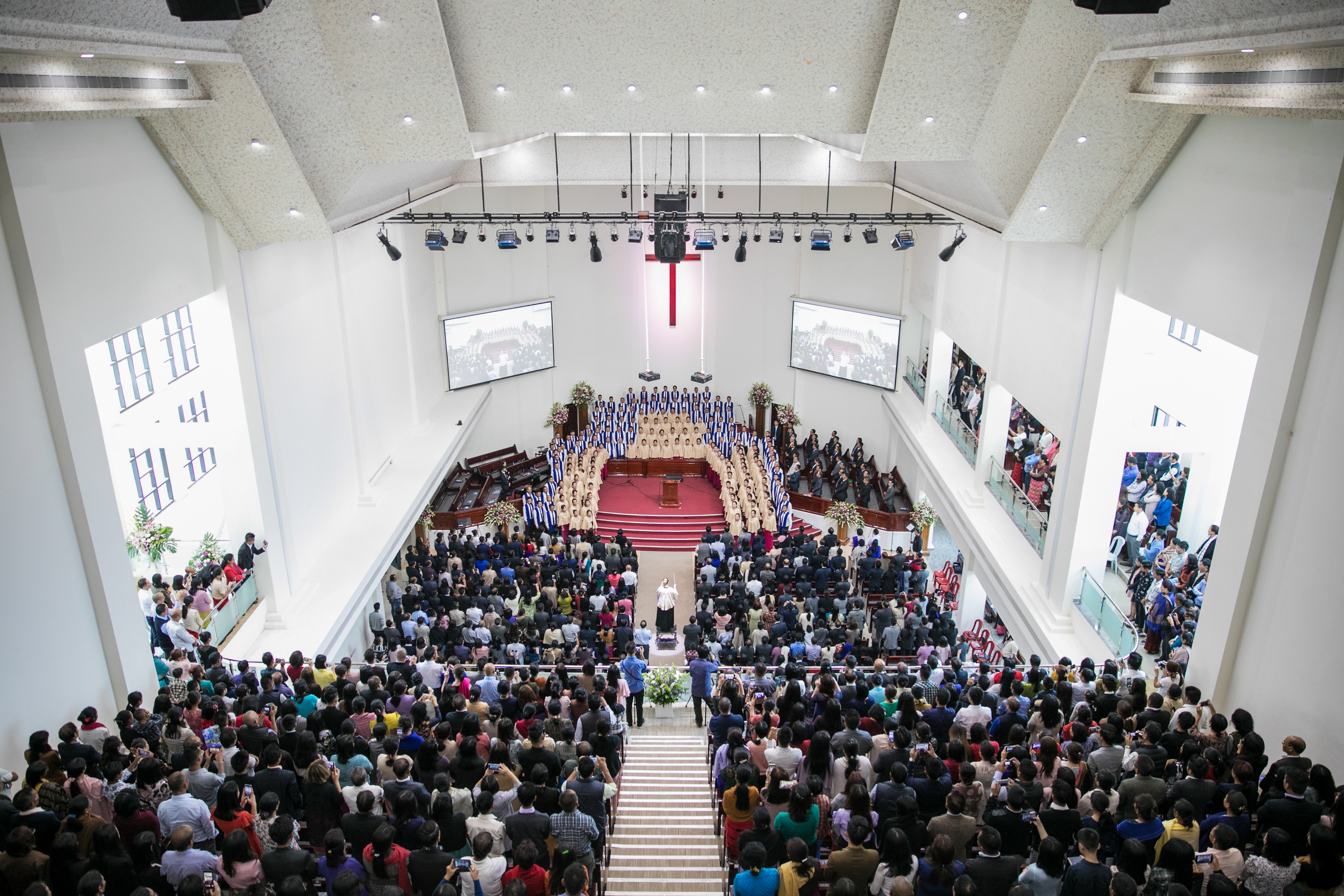
Worship service at Kohima Ao Baptist Church in Kohima, affiliated to the Nagaland Baptist Church Council, 2019.

The Nagaland Baptist Church Council has its origins in an American mission of the American Baptist Mission (American Baptist Churches USA) in 1839.

In the late 19th century, various Baptist congregations in the Naga Hills were organised into associations on tribe and linguistic lines. A broader fellowship of the Baptist churches in the Naga Hills first took the forms of the Naga Hills Baptist Church Advisory Board in Kohima. It was renamed as the Naga Hills Baptist Church Council in 1937. In 1950, the council became a founding member of the Council of Baptist Churches in Northeast India.

In 1953, it took the name of Nagaland Baptist Church Council. In 2007, there were 1,347 churches and 454,349 members.

In 1987, the Mission Conference who took place in the Pfütsero Town Baptist Church approved a global apostolate of 10,000 new missionaries.

== Resolutions ==
The Third Convention of the NBCC was held at Wokha from 31 January to 2 February 1964. An important resolution passed welcomed the 'proposed Peace Talk between the Government of India and Mr. Phizo.' Another resolution at the convention stated:

a series of talks on the great danger posed by Communism and its atheistic elements both to the body and soul of man, be conducted in every village under the auspices of the local Church, and that all the Field Supervisors be requested to provide the Churches in their respective areas with necessary literature on the subject.

== Statistics ==
According to a census published by the association in 2024, it claimed 1,724 churches and 716,495 members.

Communicant members including children and non-baptized family members are not included in the statistics.

=== Associations ===
Sl. No.	Association	Churches	Baptized Members	Ordained Ministers
1.	Ao Baptist Arogo Mungdang (ABAM)	164	1,21,005	256
2.	Angami Baptist Church Council (ABCC)	109	40,669	54
3.	Chakhesang Baptist Church Council (CBCC)	102	51,503	57
4.	Chang Baptist Lashong Thangyen (CBLT)	60	33,945	21
5.	Council of Rengma Baptist Churches (CRBC)	42	14,696	25
6.	Kuki Baptist Association Nagaland (KBAN)	16	4,800	7
7.	Konyak Baptist Bumeinok Bangjüm (KBBB)	120	91,718	34
8.	Khiamniungan Baptist Churches Association (KBCA)	50	23,765	10
9.	Lotha Baptist Ekhümkho Sanrhyutsü (LBES)	131	68,943	87
10.	Liangmei Baptist Association (LBA)	21	6,196	3
11.	Nagaland Police Baptist Churches Association (NPBCA)	30	13,920	10
12.	Phom Baptist Churches Association (PBCA)	53	29,464	20
13.	Pochury Baptist Church Council (PBCC)	30	7,069	11
14.	Sümi Aphuyemi Baptist Akukuhou Küqhakulu (SABAK)	28	10,027	18
15.	Sümi Baptist Akukuhou Küqhakulu (SBAK Nito Mount)	147	32,000	40
16.	United Sangtam Baptist Lithroti Ashimükhong (USBLA)	78	35,000	12
17.	Western Sümi Baptist Akukuhou Küqhakulu (WSBAK)	179	41,225	62
18.	Yimkhiung Baptist Borü Amükhungto (YBBA)	82	28,225	19
19.	Zeme Baptist Association (ZBA)	13	1,548	1
20.	Zeme Baptist Church Council (ZBCC)	67	20,507	12
21.	Sümi Baptist Akukuhou Küqhakulu ( SBAK Aizuto)			
	Total	1,513	676,225	759

=== Associate Members ===
Sl. No.	Associate Member	Churches	Baptized Members	Ordained Ministers
1.	Association Gorkha Baptist Churches Nagaland (AGBCN)	43	5,500	6
2.	Nagamese Baptist Churches Association (NBCA)	91	5,500	5
3.	City Church, Kohima	1	217	2
4.	Naga Christian Fellowship (NCF), Delhi	1		1
	Total	136	11, 217	14

== Schools ==
It has 2 affiliated theological institutes, the Oriental Theological Seminary in Bade (Chümoukedima district) founded in 1991 and the Trinity Theological College, Dimapur.

== See also ==
- Council of Baptist Churches in Northeast India
- List of Christian denominations in North East India
- Longri Ao
- Nagaland Missionary Movement
- Neiliezhü Üsou
- North East India Christian Council
