= Bengal Baptist Fellowship =

Bengal Baptist Fellowship is a Baptist Christian denomination in India. It was established in 1919 by the Australian Baptist Missionary Society and the New Zealand Baptist Missionary Society. It is limited to the part of India bordering Bangladesh and has approximately 1300 members.
