= Karbi-Anglong Baptist Convention =

Baptist Christian denomination in India

Karbi Anglong Baptist Convention
- Abbreviation: KABC
- Classification: Evangelicalism
- Theology: Baptist
- Moderator: Mr Nshenthang Jishing
- Associations: Council of Baptist Churches in Northeast India, Baptist World Alliance
- Headquarters: Diphu, India
- Founder: American Baptist Foreign Mission Society
- Origin: 1980
- Congregations: 354
- Members: 39,174

Karbi Anglong Baptist Convention (KABC) is a Baptist Christian denomination based in Assam, India. It is affiliated with the Council of Baptist Churches in Northeast India and the Asia Pacific Baptist Federation (Baptist World Alliance).

The Karbi Anglong Baptist Convention comprises thirteen associations. Davidson Ingti is the Regional Secretary of the convention.

== History ==
The history of Christianity in Karbi Anglong started from 1857, when the Home Board of the American Baptist Missionary Society sent out an exploratory team of missionaries to Karbi Anglong. Subsequently, they commissioned C. F. Tolman in 1859 to be the first missionary to the Karbis. Thus, in 1859, the first missionaries from USA brought the Gospel to this part of Assam. Some of those missionaries who came to Karbi Anglong were:- Rev. Cyrus Fisher Tolman, Rev. Edward P. Scott, Rev. Robert E. Neighbor, Rev. Penn E. Moore, Rev. John Moses Carvel, Rev. Oscar L. Swanson, Rev. William Ralph Hutton and Rev. Maxwell J. Chance.

The need of forming a Convention was felt in order to have fellowship in the Baptist churches among the various tribes, such as the Karbis, the Garos, the Rengmas, the Adivasis, the Nepalis, the Kacheris, and other smaller tribes living in the area. Since, Karbi are majority as well as the name of the district, it was decided to name it "Karbi Anglong Baptist Convention."

In the month of March, 1980, a joint meeting was convened to discuss on the formation of a Convention and was attended by the representatives of NKBA and PKBA, held at Upper Dokmoka Baptist Church. Rev. K. S. Ronghang was sent to CBCNEI (Guwahati) to discuss on this matter. Accordingly, he was advised to organize a Joint Consultation in the month of November, 1980. It was held at Diphu Baptist Church. Some of the prominent leaders who attended in this Consultation were : Rev. & Mrs. K. Aier, General Secretary, CBCNEI; Rev. Karbenson Sangma, General Secretary; GBC, Tura; Dr. A. Behera, ETC, Jorhat; Revd. Timothy Rongphar, the then Executive Secretary, NKBA; Rev. R. Hmar, the then Pastor of Bible Baptist Church; Mr. Wilson Tokbi, Rev. Dr. Solomon Rongpi and many other leaders of NKBA, PKBA and WRBA.

After a long deliberation, the General Secretary of CBCNEI, Rev. K. Aier suggested and encouraged the Baptist leaders of Karbi Anglong to form the Karbi Anglong Baptist Convention and come under the one umbrella of CBCNEI. Immediately, an ad-hoc body was formed with the following office bearers:

1. President : Late Sar-et Hanse
2. Vice-president : Mr. Khogen Hanse
3. Regional (General) Secretary : Rev. Khoyasing Ronghang
4. Recording Secretary : Late Bidyasing Timung
5. Treasurer : Late Rev. Siasing Phangcho

And the first General Meeting of the new Karbi Anglong Baptist Convention was held at Hamren Town Baptist Church under PKBA in 1981.

According to a census published by the association in 2023, it claimed 39,174 members and 354 churches.

== Member associations ==
1. A'chik Baptist Krima (ABK)
2. Amri Karbi Baptist Kachikruk Association (AKBKA)
3. Boro Baptist Christian Association (BBCA)
4. Bethel Baptist Association (BBA)
5. Dhansiri Valley Baptist Association (DVBA)
6. Karbi United Baptist Church (KUBC)
7. Nijang Karbi Baptist Association (NJKBA)
8. Nihang Karbi Baptist Association (NKBA)
9. Puta Karbi Baptist Association (PKBA)
10. United A'chik Baptist Krima (UABK)
11. West Karbi Anglong A'chik Baptist Krima (WKAABK)
12. Western Rengma Baptist Association (WRBA)
13. Zeme Baptist Association Assam (ZBAA)

== Schools ==
Christian English High School is a Self-supporting Mission School under the guidance of Karbi Anglong Baptist Convention. The institution is affiliated to the Board of Secondary Education Assam (SEBA).

== See also ==
- Council of Baptist Churches in Northeast India
- North East India Christian Council
- List of Christian denominations in North East India
