= Council of Baptist Churches in Northeast India =

Baptist Christian denomination in India

- Abbreviation: CNCNEI
- Classification: Protestant
- Orientation: Baptist
- Theology: Evangelical Baptist
- Associations: Asia Pacific Baptist Federation
- Headquarters: Guwahati, Assam, India
- Founder: American Baptist Foreign Mission Society
- Origin: 1950; 76 years ago
- Congregations: 8,571 (2024)
- Members: 1,564,314 (2024)
- Hospitals: 6
- Tertiary institutions: North East Christian University
- Seminaries: 11
- Official website: cbcnei.org

The Council of Baptist Churches in Northeast India is a Baptist Christian denomination in North East India. It is a member of the Asia Pacific Baptist Federation. It is also a member body of the North East India Christian Council, the regional council of the National Council of Churches in India. Rev. Dr. Namseng R. Marak is the current General Secretary.

== History ==
The first American Baptist missionaries reached North East India in 1836. Nathan Brown and O.T. Cutter, along with their wives, came to Assam hoping to find access to China through the Shans territory to Northern frontier of Burma and Assam. The group sailed up the Brahmaputra river and arrived in Sadiya on 23 March 1836, and there confronted them with dense jungles, hostile tribals and rugged hills. Yet, believing they had been led to a fruitful place they began to learn Assamese language, set up their printing press, and gave themselves to the task of translating, publishing and teaching. Thus began the work of the Baptist in the north-eastern corner of India-the beginning of CBCNEI.

Beginning from Sadiya, the work moved down the Brahmaputra river to the leading towns of Assam plains, for example, Sibsagar, Nowgong and Gauhati. Then the first Church in Garo Hills, was established at Rajasimla in 1867. The first thrust among the Nagas came from the small village of Namsang in Tirap.

Miles Bronson and family settled a short time in that village, but the work was abandoned due to illness in the family before the end of 1840. The next move in Nagaland was by Godhula Brown, an Assamese convert, and the Rev. Edwin W. Clark. The first Church among the Nagas was organized in 1872, at Dokhahaimong (Molungyimjen) village in Ao area. Rev. William Pettigrew started the Baptist Mission work in Manipur in 1896. The work among the (Mikirs) Karbis was started quite early but it did not gain much progress because of the influence of Hinduism among the people. So the work in this area has been restricted to the fringe areas adjoining the plains of Assam.

The field work in North-East India was largely the responsibility of the American Baptist Mission until 1950. In fact, the Mission could not handle the full obligation of the area and so in the 1940 the area on the North Bank of Brahmaputra river was handed over to the care of the Australian Baptist Mission (for Goalpara district) and to the General Baptist Conference (for Darrang and North Lakhimpur districts).

From the early days of the missions in North-East India there were joint meetings of missionaries and nationals to plan the work. In 1914, the National Churches formed themselves into Assam Baptist Convention (ABC). This organization was founded in January 1950 as the Council of Baptist Churches in Assam (CBCA) and was renamed Council of Baptist Churches in North-East India. The First General Secretary was Rev. A. F. Merrill. Later the name was changed to CBCAM, and finally, the Council of Baptist Churches in North-East India on geographical grounds. Almost all the Baptist Churches in Assam, Arunachal, Manipur, Meghalaya and Nagaland were brought within the Council. So since the year 1950 the field works has been brought under the ministry of the Council of Baptist Churches in North East India (CBCNEI).

According to a denomination census released in 2023, it claimed 1,500,000 members and 8,300 churches.

== Member organizations ==
The Council of Baptist Churches in Northeast India ("CBCNEI" or the "Council") is a conglomeration of Six Baptist Conventions, namely: Arunachal Baptist Church Council (ABCC), Assam Baptist Convention, Garo Baptist Convention (GBC), Karbi Anglong Baptist Convention (KABC), Manipur Baptist Convention (MBC), and Nagaland Baptist Church Council (NBCC).

== Schools ==
=== Affiliated seminaries ===
It has 11 affiliated theological institutes.

Sl. No.	College	City	State
1.	Arunachal Theological College	Itanagar	Arunachal Pradesh
2.	Baptist Theological College	Pfutsero	Nagaland
3.	Clark Theological College	Mokokchung	Nagaland
4.	Mon Theological College	Mon	Nagaland
5.	Oriental Theological Seminary	Chümoukedima	Nagaland
6.	Shalom Bible Seminary	Kohima	Nagaland
7.	Trinity Theological College	Dimapur	Nagaland
8.	Witter Theological College	Vankhosung	Nagaland
9.	Eastern Theological College	Jorhat	Assam
10.	Harding Theological College	Tura	Meghalaya
11.	Manipur Theological College	Kanggui	Manipur

=== Affiliated University ===
The North East Christian University was founded in 2013 in Dimapur.

Sl. No.	College	City	State	Established
1.	North East Christian University	Dimapur	Nagaland	2013

== Hospitals ==
The Council has six hospitals which are providing healthcare to the sick and the suffering. They are located in four states in the region. The first hospital work started with the American Baptist Mission Hospital in Assam in 1915, consolidating the work of Dr. Herbert William Kirby.

Sl. No.	Hospital	City	State	Ref
1.	Babupara Christian Hospital	Nisangram	Meghalaya	
2.	Impur Christian Hospital	Mopungchuket	Nagaland	
3.	Jorhat Christian Medical Centre	Jorhat	Assam	Jorhat Christian Medical Centre
4.	Tura Christian Hospital	Tura	Meghalaya	
5.	Kanggui Christian College	Kanggui	Manipur	
6.	Satribari Christian Hospital	Guwahati	Assam	Satribari Hospital

== Conference centre ==
Located on the flush green cool campus of the CBCNEI, the Conference Center caters the needs of the Council’s program activities and other Christian Organization program.

== Student ministry ==
The Council runs three hostels for college students. Through these institutions the boarders have the opportunities to attend Bible camps, vesper services, theological lectures, Bible studies, games and sports.

1. White Memorial Hostel Ministry
2. Lewis Memorial Hostel Ministry
3. Shillong Tyrannus Hall

== Christian Literature Centre ==
Christian Literature Centre (CLC) is the literature wing of the Council of Baptist Churches in North East India, to cater to the needs of the churches in North East India that have various languages and dialects. It was established in 1969.

Sl. No.	Centre	City	State
1.	Christian Literature Centre	Guwahati	Assam
2.	Christian Literature Centre	Dimapur	Nagaland
3.	Christian Literature Centre	Imphal	Manipur
4.	Christian Literature Centre	Senapati	Manipur
5.	Christian Literature Centre	Ukhrul	Manipur

== Statistics ==
Churches and Membership figures as reported to the Baptist World Alliance as of 2025.

Sl. No.	Convention	Churches	Baptized Members
1.	Arunachal Baptist Church Council (ABCC)	1,255	152,532
2.	Assam Baptist Convention (ABC)	1,036	44,559
3.	Garo Baptist Convention (GBC)	2,652	377,132
4.	Karbi-Anglong Baptist Convention (KABC)	356	40,866
5.	Manipur Baptist Convention (MBC)	1,548	232,730
6.	Nagaland Baptist Church Council (NBCC)	1,724	716,495

== See also ==
- Baptist World Alliance
- Boro Baptist Church Association
- Boro Baptist Convention
- Rabha Baptist Church Union
- List of Christian denominations in North East India
- North East India Christian Council
