= Asia Pacific Baptist Federation =

- Abbreviation: APBF
- Classification: Protestant
- Theology: Evangelical Christianity/Congregationalist
- Associations: Baptist World Alliance
- Region: 22 countries
- Headquarters: Okinawa City, Japan
- Origin: 1972
- Congregations: 40,000
- Official website: apbf.org

The Asia Pacific Baptist Federation (APBF) is a federation of 65 Baptist associations and is one of six regional fellowships in the Baptist World Alliance. The headquarters is in Okinawa City, Japan.

== History ==
English missionary William Carey started his work in the Dutch controlled Serampore north of Calcutta, India in 1793, initially focussing on Bible translation, preaching, teaching, and the founding of schools. One of the major schools established by this mission is Serampore College, founded in 1818.

Other pioneers include Joshua Marshman and William Ward who together with Carey became known as the Serampore Trio. Of the three, Ward was instrumental in converting American Congregationalist missionary, Adoniram Judson, to Baptist beliefs and baptised both Judson and his wife, Ann Haseltine Judson, in Serampore.

Judson later began Baptist missionary work in Burma on 13 July 1813 upon his arrival in Rangoon.

The APBF was formed in the then British colony of Hong Kong in 1972 as the Asian Baptist Federation (ABF). It joined the Baptist World Alliance in 1975.

It adopted its current name in 2007 after a resolution was approved during the ABF Congress held in the city of Chiang Mai, Thailand from 2 May to 6 May 2007.

== Organization ==
The APBF represents almost 60 Baptist denominations (known as conventions or unions) from 20 countries, encompassing almost 30,000 congregations with more than 5 million baptized believers. The single largest member of the APBF is the Myanmar Baptist Convention which claims more than 1.1 million baptized believers.

The principal officers of the APBF are:

Office	Name	Territory
President	Rev. Edwin Lam	Singapore
Vice Presidents	Mr. Bijoy Sangma Mr. Ratu Inoke Kubuabola Rev. Mark Wilson	India Fiji Australia
General Secretary	Rev. Dr. Vesekhoyi Tetseo	Okinawa, Japan
Treasurer	Mr. Peter Leau	Australia

== Members ==
According to a census published by the association in 2023, it claimed 65 member associations in 22 countries, 40,000 churches.

== See also ==
- Baptist World Alliance
