= North East India Christian Council =

Protestant ecumenical council

North East India Christian Council (NEICC) is a Protestant ecumenical council of North East India, affiliated to the National Council of Churches in India as one of the regional councils in the year 1939.

== History ==
The North East India Christian Council (NEICC) was established on 23 November 1937 by the American Baptist Mission; the Santal Mission of the Northern Churches; the Gossner Evangelical Lutheran Mission; the Co-operative Baptist Mission of North America- "the Mid Mission", the English Baptist Mission South Lushai Hills; the Church of God; the Welsh Presbyterian Mission; and the Church of North India.

== Organization ==
=== Office Bearers ===
The Office Bearers are for a term of two years, except the General Secretary whose term is four years. The present Office Bearers for the term 2024-2026 are:

1. President: Rev. S.R. Dkhar, Khasi Jaintia Presbyterian Church Synod Mihngi
2. Vice President: Rev. Kamson Rongphar, Karbi Anglong Baptist Convention
3. Vice President: Rev. Lalfakzuala, Mizoram Presbyterian Church Synod
4. General Secretary: Rev. Dr. Ramengliana, Manipur Presbyterian Church Synod
5. Treasurer: Rev. I. Khyriem, Church of God (Ekklesia)

=== Committees ===
The council has the following Committees:

1. Executive Committee
2. Working Committee

Six Standing Committees as the following:

1. Christian Home and Stewardship Committee
2. Church Union Committee
3. Mission & Evangelism Committee
4. Peace and Justice Committee
5. Theological Education Committee
6. Trust Management Committee.

=== Youth and Women Assembly ===
The council has Women and Youth Assembly called NEICCWA and NEICCYA having separate functions and administration under the guidance of the NEICC. Each of them meets every two years in Biennial Assembly. Women Assembly has full-time Secretary and run a hostel for women. Both the assemblies often organize various programs for its members.

=== Annual Session/Biennial Session ===
The Council meets once every two years in a Biennial Session in the third week of May in which each member Church and associate members send their representatives according to the basis of representation made by the council.

== Union Christian College (UCC) ==
The NEICC runs a college called, ‘the Union Christian College’ at Umiam Khwan (Barapani), Ri Bhoi district, Meghalaya, 27 km away from Shillong. It is fully residential and co-educational. It offers courses in Arts and Science and Commerce streams. It has been placed under the Deficit System of the Government of Meghalaya. A Chaplain and a Doctor is also posted to care for spiritual and physical life of the community. The college is affiliated to North Eastern Hill University (NEHU).

== UCC Higher Secondary School ==
Alongside the Union Christian College, NEICC also runs UCC Higher Secondary School offering Arts and Science streams.

== NEICC Day of Prayer ==
All affiliated bodies observe the NEICC Day of Prayer, that falls annually on the third Sunday of October. Prayers are offered for the life and ministry of NEICC, sermons are preached on a selected theme for that day and special offerings are collected for NEICC funds. In some cities, Pulpit Exchange programs are practiced where preachers of NEICC units would go and preach in the pulpits of other denominations. This practice is highly beneficial for the promotion of unity and mutual understanding among the units.

== Membership ==
Membership is open to any Protestant church in North East India with a membership of 5000 and above, that is recommended by a unit which is nearest to the applying body. At present, there are 55 units, 37 churches and 18 para-church organizations. The following is the list of NEICC as it stands in 2022:

=== Member Churches ===
1. Assam Baptist Convention (ABC), Assam
2. Baptist Church of Mizoram (BCM), Mizoram
3. Biateram Presbyterian Church Synod (BPCS), Assam
4. Bodo Evangelical Lutheran Church (BELC), Assam
5. Cachar Hill Tribes Synod (CHT), Assam
6. Church of God (Meghalaya & Assam) (COGMA), Meghalaya
7. Church of God (Ecclesia)(COGE), Meghalaya
8. Church of North India, North East India (CNI-NEI), Meghalaya
9. Council of Baptist Churches in NEI (CBCNEI), Assam
10. Christ National Church (CNC), Meghalaya
11. Evangelical Assembly Church (EAC), Manipur
12. Evangelical Church of Maraland (ECM), Mizoram
13. Evangelical Free Church of India (EFCI), Manipur
14. Evangelical Churches Association (ECA), Manipur
15. Garo Baptist Convention (GBC), Meghalaya
16. Gossner Evangelical Lutheran Church (GELC), Assam
17. Lairam Jesus Christ Baptist Church (LIKBK), Mizoram
18. Independent Church of India (ICI), Manipur
19. Isua Krista Kohhran (IKK), Mizoram
20. Karbi Anglong Baptist Convention (KABC), Assam
21. Karbi Anglong Presbyterian Church Synod(KAPC), Assam
22. Khasi Jaintia Presbyterian Synod Sepngi(KJPSS), Meghalaya
23. Khasi Jaintia Presbyterian Synod Mihngi(KJPSM), Meghalaya
24. Lower Assam Baptist Fellowship (LABF), Assam
25. Manipur Baptist Convention (MBC), Manipur
26. Manipur Presbyterian Church Synod(MPS), Manipur
27. Mizoram Presbyterian Church Synod(MPCS), Mizoram
28. Nagaland Baptist Church Council (NBCC), Nagaland
29. North Bank Baptist Christian Association (NBBCA), Assam
30. Northern Evangelical Lutheran Church (NELC), Assam
31. Presbyterian Independent Church of NEI(PICNEI), Assam
32. Reformed Presbyterian Church, North Eastern India(RPCNEI), Manipur
33. Ri-Bhoi Presbyterian Church Synod(RBPS), Meghalaya
34. The Salvation Army, India Eastern Territory(SAIET), Mizoram
35. Tripura Baptist Christian Union (TBCU), Tripura
36. Tripura Presbyterian Church Synod (TPCS), Tripura
37. Zou Presbyterian Church Synod (ZPCS), Manipur

=== Associate Units ===
1. Association of Theologically Trained Women in India (ATTWI), Mizoram Branch
2. Church's Auxiliary for Social Action, North East India (CASA), Guwahati
3. Friends Missionary Prayer Band (FMPB), Shillong
4. India Campus Crusade for Christ (CCC), Bairasal
5. India Every Home Crusade North East India (IEHC-NEI), Shillong
6. Mizo Theological Association (MTA), Aizawl
7. North East Centre for Training and Research (NECTAR), Shillong
8. NEI Christian Endeavour (NEICE), Shillong
9. NEI Committee on Relief and Development (NEICORD), Shillong
10. North East India Harvest Network(NEIHN), Shillong
11. Serving in Missions North East India (SIMNEI), Shillong
12. Shillong Christian Youth Organisation & Conference (SCYO &C), Shillong
13. Students Christian Movement, Meghalaya Zone (SCMM)
14. The Leprosy Mission, Mizoram (TLM), Aizawl
15. Thlarau Bo Zawngtute (TBZ), Aizawl.
16. World Vision of India, NEI, (WVI) Guwahati
17. Young Men Christian Association (YMCA NEI ), Guwahati
18. Zoram Evangelical Fellowship (ZEF), Aizawl

== See also ==
- Council of Baptist Churches in North-East India
- National Council of Churches in India
- List of Christian denominations in North East India
