= List of rulers of the Duala =

The rulers of the Duala are the headmen, chiefs, paramount chiefs, and kings of the Duala people of Cameroon. The earliest Duala rulers known, according to Duala's oral history, were Mbongo and his son Mbedi. From Mbedi's home at Pīti, northeast of the modern city of Douala, his sons migrated southward. Ewale a Mbedi settled on the Wouri River at the Bight of Bonny (modern Douala) and became the eponymous founder of the Duala people.

Over time, the Duala split into various lineages. The earliest was the Priso sublineage, which established independence from the Bell lineage in the late 18th century. The Akwa lineage followed suit sometime in the early 19th century. Each of these families established a population centre along the banks of the Wouri. By the 19th century, Douala was thus divided into several of these residential areas, referred to as towns.

Beginning as early as the 18th century with Doo a Makongo, European traders started referring to the Duala rulers as chiefs and kings (kine in Duala). A dichotomy emerged under which the rulers of Akwa and Bell were kings, while the leaders of smaller lineages were chiefs or princes. These rulers were given Europeanised names, such as King George or King Akwa. Beginning with the colonial era, German, French, and British colonial governments designated various Duala rulers as paramount chiefs. During this era, Duala rulers were often deposed and exiled for any perceived infraction against the colonial government. Traditions of royalty have since ceased in some of these lineages, although in modern times, the royal line of some lineages has been reconstituted after an interregnum.

== Early rulers ==
Reign	Common name	Duala name	Title(s)	Remarks
Unknown		Mbengo/Mbongo	?
Unknown		Mbedi a Mbongo	?	Lived at Pīti, the ancestral home of the Duala and other Sawa ethnic groups.
Unknown		Ewale a Mbedi	?	Eponymous ancestor of the Duala (Dwala). Moved from Piti to Douala. May have had contact with European traders.
Early 17th century	Monneba	Mulabe/Mulobe a Ewale	?	Flourished c. 1630. Mentioned in Dutch sources. His name is the only known for the first 150 years of European contact with the Duala. Father of Mase and Ngie below.

== Bonanjo/Bonadoo/Bell lineage ==
Reign	Common name	Duala name	Title(s)	Remarks
Unknown		Mase a Mulabe	?
Unknown		Njo a Mase	?
Unknown		Makongo/Mukonga a Njo	?
Late 18th century	Joss or George	Doo a Makongo/Mukonga	Senior chief, King	Flourished 1788–90. Was the senior chief of his time.
Early 19th century	Bell	Bele a Doo	King	Eponymous ruler of the Bell lineage. Born c. 1750. Adopted by Joss after seizing his mother. Birth father was a Mungo. Chosen as father's successor after Joss expelled for violent behaviour. Founded Bonaberi, which is named for him.
19th century	Bell	Bebe a Bele	King
?–1858	Bell	Lobe a Bebe	King	Young in 1842. Died 1858.
c. 1858–1897	Ndumbe Lobe Bell	Ndumbe a Lobe	King, Paramount Chief	The famous King Bell who signed the 1884 German-Duala Treaty.
c. 1897–?	Manga Ndumbe Bell	Manga a Ndumbe	King, Paramount Chief
1908–1914	Rudolf Duala Manga Bell	Duala Manga	King, Paramount Chief	Executed in 1914.
?–1966	Alexandre Douala Manga Bell	Alexander Ndumbe	King	Died 1966.
1950?–present	Lobe Bell	Bell	King, Paramount Chief

=== Bonapriso/Joss sublineage ===
Reign	Common name	Duala name	Title(s)	Remarks
Late 18th century	Preshaw, Preese, or Peter	Priso a Doo	Chief	Eldest son of Joss, brother of Bell I. Seems to have lost his inheritance due to violent behaviour with European traders. Eventually came to dominate the town Bonapriso. He may have been known as Peter. Legend states he died at Bimbia.
		Doo a Priso	Chief
Late 19th century		Elame a Doo	Chief	Signatory to the 1884 German-Duala Treaty.

=== Bonaberi/Hickory sublineage ===
Reign	Common name	Duala name	Title(s)	Remarks
Unknown		Mbape a Bele	Chief	Son of Bell I.
Late 19th century	Lock Priso	Kum a Mbape	Prince, Chief	Signatory to the 1884 German-Duala Treaty.

== Bonambela/Akwa lineage ==
This list omits several rulers who served but briefly and who were succeeded by brothers rather than sons.

Reign	Common name	Duala name	Title(s)	Remarks
Unknown		Ngie/Mbela/Mbele a Mulobe	?	The Bonabele/Deido sublineage is descended through his son Kwane.
17th or 18th century		Mapoka a Ngie	?	Tradition holds that he travelled to Europe.
Unknown		Kue/Kuo a Mapoka	?	May have been a slave and adopted son . May have been related to a Bassa group through maternal descent, marriage, or residence.
Unknown		Kwa a Kuo	?
1814(?)–1846	Akwa	Ngando a Kwa	King	Eponymous ruler of the Akwa lineage. Flourished 1814. He claimed the Bonambela succession after the death of Ewonde and claimed equal standing with Bele. Died 1846.
mid-19th century	Akwa	Mpondo a Ngando	King
before 1879–c. 1905	Akwa	Dika a Mpondo	King, Paramount Chief	Was in power in 1879. Served five months hard labour for exploiting several oil wells in Bassa villages in 1905.
Unknown	Ernest Betote Akwa	Betote	King, Paramount Chief	Died 1976.

=== Bonebele/Deido sublineage ===
Reign	Common name	Duala name	Title(s)	Remarks
Late 18th century	Quan or Angua	Kwane a Ngie	Chief	Son of Ngie. Flourished 1788–90. He seems to have been the most powerful Duala ruler during the time of Doo (King George).
Early 19th century		Ewonde a Kwane	Chief	Duala tradition states that his daughter Lesenge married into Isubu royalty and was the mother of King William I of Bimbia.
Unknown		Enjobe	Chief	He was an Abo captive or immigrant. Married Kanya, daughter of above.
Unknown		Ebele a Enjobe	Chief	Eponymous founder of the Bonabele (Pidgin: Deido) sublineage.
before 1845 – after 1874	Ned Deido	Ebule an Ebele	Chief
1876	Charley Deido	Eyum an Ebele	Chief	Younger half brother of Ebule. Executed in 1876.
1876–after 1884		Ekwala	Chief	Signatory of the 1884 German-Duala Treaty.
Unknown		Epee	Paramount Chief
?–c. 1900		Eboa	Paramount Chief
c. 1900–1949				Interregnum
1949–present		Ekwala II	?
