= Joseph Merrick (missionary) =

Jamaican missionary (1808–1849)

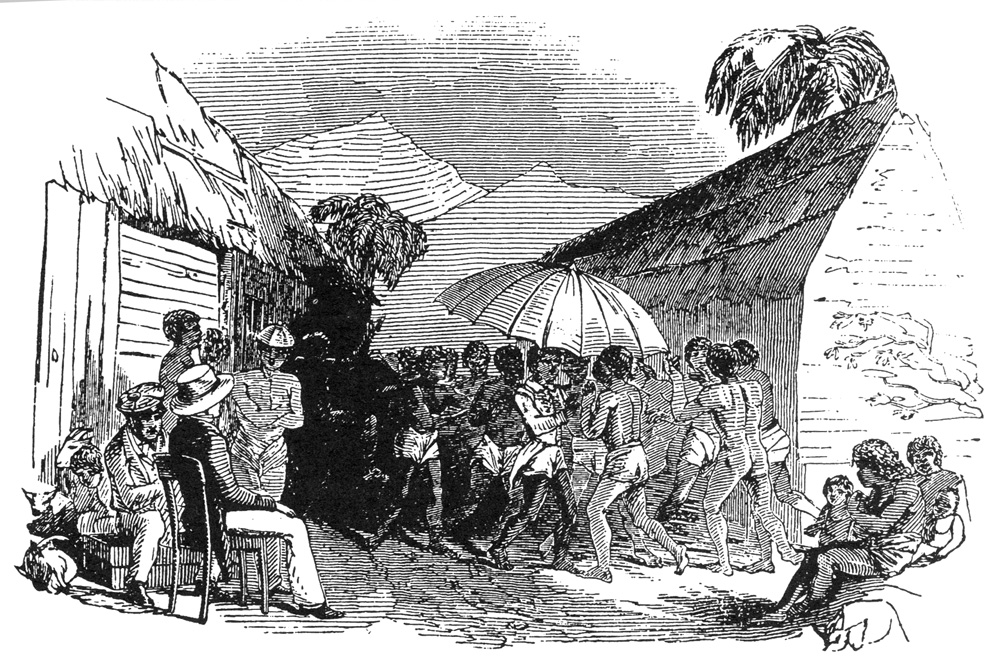
Joseph Merrick at an Isubu funeral in Bimbia, 1845

Joseph Merrick (August 1808 – 22 October 1849) was a Jamaican Baptist missionary who, assisted by Joseph Jackson Fuller, established the first successful mission on the Cameroon coast of Africa.

== Biography ==
Merrick was born in August 1808 in Jamaica.

Merrick began preaching in 1837 in Jamaica and was ordained a full missionary in 1838. In 1842, Reverend John Clarke and Dr. G. K. Prince, members of the Baptist Missionary Society of London, were seeking Jamaican lay missionaries to join them on an expedition to the Cameroon coast. Merrick signed on. The party reached England on 8 September 1842, and arrived at Spanish-controlled Santa Isabel on the island of Fernando Po in 1843.

=== Ministry ===
He visited Bimbia, Cameroon, in 1843 and spoke to King William of the Isubu people to request permission to establish a church on the mainland. Despite some initial resistance, the king acquiesced. Merrick founded the Jubilee Mission in 1844. That same year, he founded a school. Over the next four to five years, translated parts of the New Testament into the Isubu language, set up a brick-making machine and a printing press, and used the latter to publish his Bible translation and a textbook for teaching in Isubu. Merrick made excursions into the interior, as when he climbed Mount Cameroon and when he became the first non-African to visit the Bakoko people.

In 1849, Merrick was in ill health. He set off for England on furlough, and on 22 October, he died at sea. On Merrick's death, Joseph Jackson Fuller took charge of the mission station and congregation at Bimbia. Merrick's efforts also paved the way for Alfred Saker to make further progress – he made use of Merrick's printing press to translate and print the Bible in Duala. Joseph Merrick Baptist College in Ndu, Northwest Province, Cameroon, is named for him.
