= Suwu =

Suwu may refer to:

- Subu people, a Cameroonian ethnic group, also known as Suwu people
- Suwu language, a language used by Subu people
- Suwu, Gansu (苏武), a town in Minqin County, Gansu, China

== See also ==
- Su Wu (140BC - 60BC), Han dynasty diplomat
