= Mbedi a Mbongo =

Mbedi a Mbongo is the common ancestor of many of the Sawa coastal ethnic groups of Cameroon according to their oral traditions. Stories say that he lived at a place called Piti, northeast of present-day Douala. From there, his sons migrated south toward the coast in what are known as the Mbedine events. These movements may be mythical in many cases, but anthropologists and historians accept the plausibility of a migration of some Sawa ancestors to the coast during the 16th century.

== Narrative and historicity ==
According to Sawa oral history, Mbedi, the son of Mbongo, lived at Piti on the Dibamba River, northeast of present-day Douala. He was the father of Bojongo, Dibongo, Ewale, and several others. For reasons that vary with the tale, Mbedi's sons left him and migrated south to the coast. Often, this is ascribed to a family conflict, such as one between Mbedi and Ewale over imported European cloth. Another tale says that the sons wanted to trade directly with European merchants on the coast. The sons migrated south, parting company at various points. Each man became the founder of a different ethnic group.

Based on records of Dutch traders, the first known Duala ruler was a man the merchants dubbed Monneba, who lived at the present site of Douala in the 16th century. Ardener and others suggest that Monneba was in fact Mulobe, the son of Ewale and grandson of Mbedi according to Duala tradition. This would place Mbedi's lifetime in the late 16th century.

The stories about Mbedi lack any of the heroics of other founder stories. The only other figure who is shared by so many Sawa ethnic groups is Jeki la Njambè, an epic character who is almost certainly mythical. Therefore, historians and anthropologists find Mbedi's existence to be completely plausible.

The migrations of Mbedi's sons, known as the Mbedine events, seem more questionable. The Sawa claims of descent from Mbedi may simply reflect the hegemony of the Duala people during early contact with Europeans and the colonial period. The Duala were the elites of the day, so other peoples may simply have adopted the Duala origin myths and claimed kinship through brothers of the Duala's founder, Ewale a Mbedi. Some of these, such as the Bakweri, Bakole, and Limba, speak languages closely related to Duala, so the proposed kinship is not difficult to accept. However, even Sawa whose language more resembles that of the Bassa and Bakoko claim descent from Mbedi, lending this hypothesis some feasibility.
