= Cameroon Baptist Convention =

Association of Christian churches in Cameroon

- Abbreviation: CBC
- Classification: Evangelical Christianity
- Theology: Baptist
- Associations: Baptist World Alliance
- Headquarters: Bamenda, Cameroon
- Origin: 1954
- Congregations: 1,535
- Members: 228,507
- Hospitals: 8
- Primary schools: 19
- Secondary schools: 12
- Seminaries: Cameroon Baptist Theological Seminary
- Official website: cameroonbaptistconvention.org

The Cameroon Baptist Convention is a Baptist Christian denomination in Cameroon. It is affiliated with the Baptist World Alliance. The headquarters is in Bamenda.

== History ==
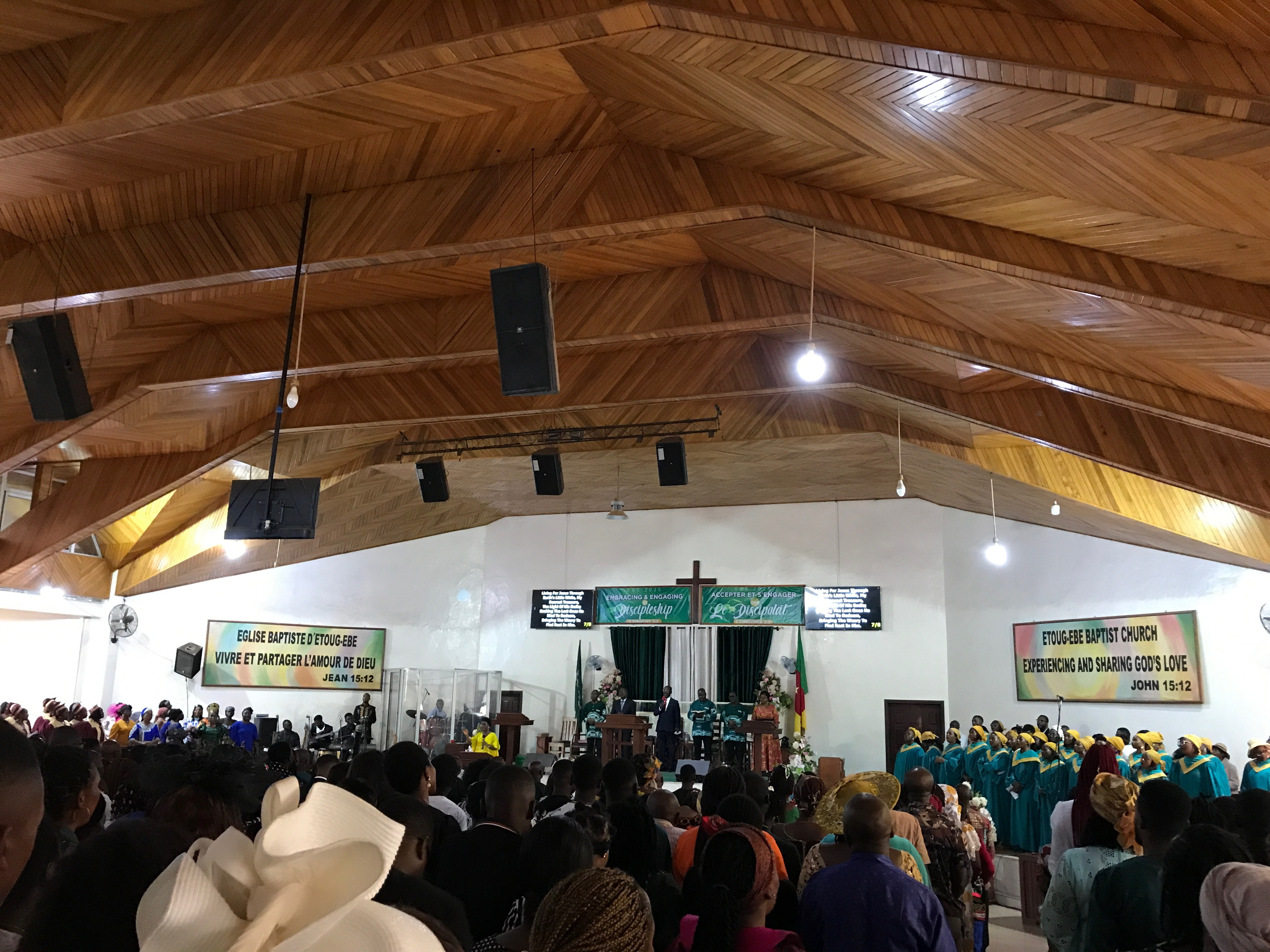
Worship service at Etoug-Ebe Baptist Church in Yaoundé.

The Convention has its origins in a British mission of the Baptist Missionary Society in Bimbia in 1843, led by the Jamaican missionary Joseph Merrick. In 1845, the English missionary Alfred Saker and his wife arrived in Douala. In 1849, Saker founded Bethel Baptist Church. In 1931, the mission was taken over by the North American Baptist Conference. In 1954, the Cameroon Baptist Convention was formally founded. According to a census published by the association in 2023, it claimed 228,507 members and 1,535 churches.

== Schools ==
The convention has 19 primary schools, 12 secondary schools.

It also has 4 professional training institutes.

It has 1 affiliated theological institute, the Cameroon Baptist Theological Seminary founded in 1947 in Ndu.

== Health Services ==
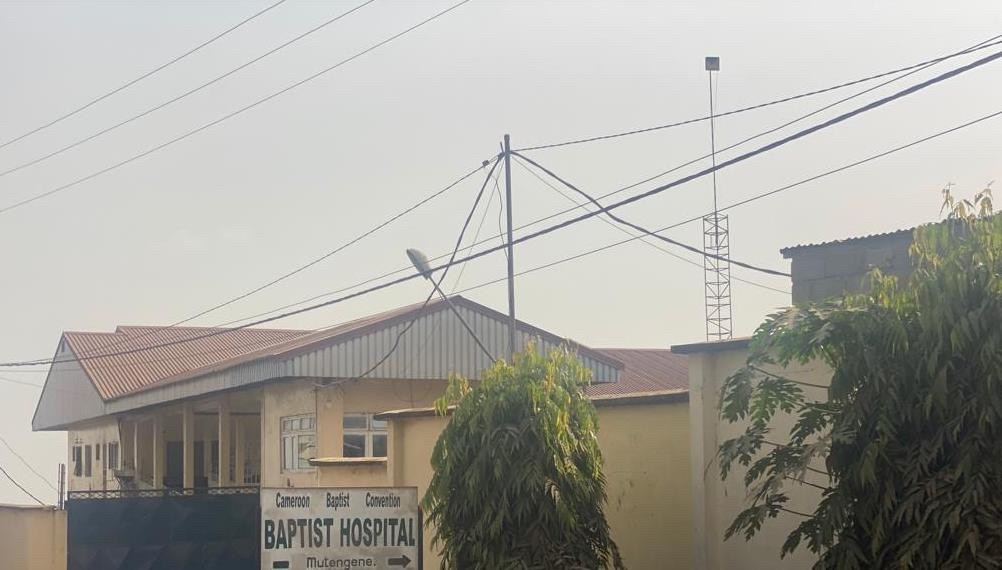
Baptist Hospital Mutengene (Tiko).

The convention has 8 hospitals and 34 health centers, gathered in the Cameroon Baptist Convention Health Services.
