= Priso a Doo =

Duala ruler

- Born: Wouri River, Cameroons
- Died: Bimbia or Subu
- Other names: Preshaw, Preese, Peter
- Occupation: Ruler
- Known for: Duala ruler whose disinheritance contributed to the split of the Duala into the Bell and Akwa sublineages
- Parent: Doo a Makongo

Priso a Doo, also known as Preshaw, Preese, and possibly Peter, was a Duala ruler who lived on the Wouri River of the Cameroons in the late 18th century. His violent behaviour lost him his birthright and catalysed the split of the Duala people into rival Bell and Akwa sublineages.

== European sources ==
European sources mention several rulers with names similar to Priso living on the Cameroons coast; these may all refer to the same individual. British records from 1788 and 1790 list a Duala leader named Preshaw as a subordinate of another ruler known as King George. Records from the British brig Sarah from 1790 indicates that Preshaw received the third largest "dash" (gift) from them, behind George and Angua and ahead of a ruler named Bell. The same records mention a Peter (a Doe), and a Peter's Town appears on a 1790 map by Captain Roger Latham. According to an 1826 journal by R. M. Jackson, a leader named Preese became violent toward Europeans in 1792. Jackson blames Preese for piracy in the Wouri estuary. A work by James W. Holman mentions piracy in the estuary but gives no names.

== Duala oral history ==
Duala oral history adds further detail. Priso lived on the left bank of the Wouri in the town of Bonapriso. As the eldest son of Doo a Makongo (likely the King George in European records), Priso was the heir apparent to his father's position and wealth. However, he robbed and killed European merchants, so his father disowned him. His rapine grew so violent that his brother, Bele a Doo (Bell from the European records) fled to the opposite bank of the Wouri River, where he founded the Bonaberi township. Priso's father and or brother collaborated with the Europeans, which allowed the merchants to capture Priso. One tale claims that after Priso had been caught, Bele populated Bonaberi with the captives Priso had taken. Another says that Priso and Bele fought at first but then teamed up against the Bakoko at Bonaberi. They then became rivals in trade, with Bele the eventual victor. Duala oral tradition holds that Priso died in Bimbia, possibly by violent means. A rival tradition places his death in Subu.

Priso's role in Duala legend is that of a rebellious warrior who marks the transition from the relatively peaceful days of the Duala founders to the strife known during European trade and colonialism. The Duala of the Bell sublineage have a song about him: "Priso a Doo, Here Comes Warfare". Priso's actions and the question of succession that resulted from his disinheritance emboldened Ngando a Kwa to claim not only the rival Bonambela succession but also equal status to Bele a Doo, who succeeded Doo in lieu of Priso.
