= Joseph Jackson Fuller =

Jamaican Baptist missionary (1825–1908)

The Rev. Joseph Jackson Fuller (29 June 1825 – 11 December 1908), Baptist missionary to the pre-colonial African Chiefdoms of the Cameroons.

He was one of the earliest slaves to be freed in Jamaica (initially under the partial freedoms of the "apprenticeship act") who went on to become well-educated and travel internationally. He headed mission stations, teaching, preaching, brick-making, and translating books such as John Bunyan's Pilgrim's Progress into Duala. Retiring to England, Fuller ended his days as a public speaker for Baptist and missionary audiences, sometimes before thousands of people.

== Early life in Jamaica ==
Joseph Jackson Fuller was born in Spanish Town, Jamaica on 29 June 1825. There are two stories of his origins, one where he was the son of Alexander McLeod Fuller, a slave, and one saying his father was Alexander Jackson. When he was eight years old, the "apprenticeship act", giving immediate freedom to those six years of age and below, and an intermediate status for those of his age and older, was enacted. At this time a Baptist mission house offered Joseph's mother reduced fees of 3d a week to enrol Joseph and his brother Samuel as pupils, helped by his grandmother who ran a small grocer's shop. The schoolmaster, Mr Kirby, found Joseph learnt quickly, and brought him to the attention of the Baptist minister at Spanish Town, Mr Phillipo.

When in 1838, eight hundred thousand slaves in the West Indies were made free, the event became an abiding memory for Joseph Fuller. In speeches many years later in England he told of how the people went to the various chapels to share in the watchnight services. He went to the Baptist chapel at Spanish Town where his father was an active member, and found it overflowing with people in their thousands outside. A grave was dug and a coffin prepared, containing slave's handcuffs, chains and shackles. The people stayed all night, and at 6 o'clock in the morning a horn blew to summon the start of the working day, whereupon they lowered the coffin: they "buried old slavery".

== Baptist Mission to Africa ==
Beginning in 1839, Jamaican Baptists and English missionary Baptists to Jamaica (such as James Phillippo, Thomas Burchell, Samuel Oughton and William Knibb) proposed the establishment of a mission to West Africa. The English Baptist and abolitionist William Knibb, and two Jamaican Baptists, Henry Beckford and Edward Barrett took the matter up directly during their visit to Britain in 1840 to attend the world's first international anti-slavery convention. As the mission scheme began, Joseph and his parents were given the opportunity to join the Baptist Missionary Society project as pioneers, to evangelise, bring education and welfare to, and encourage an end to slavery among some of the traditional chiefdoms and kingdoms of West Africa.

His parents had already travelled in 1839 to the Spanish island of Fernando Po off the Cameroon coast of West Africa. On November 30, 1843, Fuller, together with his brother Samuel and 35 other West Indians, set sail to join them in a group led by John Clarke, arriving after a difficult three-month voyage. On Fernando Po, the Fuller family joined, or were soon joined by, others in this venture, including the Jamaican Joseph Merrick and the Englishman Alfred Saker. The Society's missionaries on Fernando Po ventured to the mainland to negotiate land on which to set up missions on either side of the Wouri estuary at Bimbia and Douala.

The Bimbia mission station and school, the first in mainland Cameroons, was founded in 1844/5 by the Fuller and Merrick families, and was quickly followed by a second at Duala founded by Alfred Saker and his family with the Sierra Leonian Thomas Horton Johnson. Surviving members of the founding families returned to Fernando Po in the late 1840s, from where, after an interval, further missions were later established, most notably Alfred Saker's founding of Victoria on his return to the mainland with slaves liberated therefrom, in 1858.

Fuller's role in these founding missions became particularly significant after the early death of Merrick, whereupon he took charge of the congregation at Bimbia. He was a genial, humorous preacher, and his message to those in Bimbia was so convincing that, besides the local people, he attracted a village chief and a group of nobles to throw down their "fetishes" and exclaim: "Now we will try yours!" In the 1850s Joseph Fuller led the Bethel congregation in Duala. His group later became known as the Free Native Baptists.

Fuller was ordained on 4 April 1859 by Alfred Saker and continued in Baptist work in Cameroon for more than thirty years.

In about 1850 Joseph married Elizabeth Johnson, a Jamaican school teacher at Fernando Po, and they had three children before her death nine years later; in 1861 he remarried, becoming husband to Charlotte Diboll, daughter of Joseph Diboll, an English missionary.

In 1869 Fuller and his family travelled to England for the first time, visiting his in-laws' native Norfolk, where his oratory and first-hand account about the end of slavery in Jamaica impressed audiences. He then travelled to Jamaica, visiting his mother, and speaking in chapels to gather further funds for mission work in Africa. On returning to England, he found his eldest son by Elizabeth Johnson, Alexander Merrick Fuller (1849–1898) an apprenticeship at an engineering company in Norwich. Alexander settled in Norwich, Norfolk. He married Sophia Mace in 1874. They had four children, daughters Florence Elizabeth, Edith Charlotte, Courteney Heilda and son Francis McLeod. Alexander returned to Africa, where he died in 1898. To this day Alexander still has family living in Norwich. Norfolk. Back in the Cameroons, Fuller became head of the mission until Germany took over the country and the Baptist missionaries had to move away to the Congo. Joseph Fuller oversaw the transfer, working in Bethel and Victoria in 1887 and 1888, and then left for England, shortly after his wife. His son by his second wife was taken to England by the Jamaican missionary John Pinnock.

== Years in England ==
Settling in London, first at Barnes, and then at Sydner Road in Stoke Newington from where he attended Hackney's Devonshire Road Baptist chapel, Joseph's powers of oratory stood him in good stead and he gave talks throughout England. In one engagement - at Birmingham Town Hall in October 1889 - four thousand people came to listen to him. Thomas Lewis, a fellow Baptist missionary, writing in his book These Seventy Years, recalled Joseph Jackson's popularity as a public speaker:

In England, pleading the cause of his African brother, nobody had a better reception from English audiences.

In 1892 Fuller was photographed as part of the group who presided over the centenary of the Baptist Missionary Society, and at least one of his sons continued this work.

== Attends Baptist Missionary event in Wales ==
In February 1895, Fuller attended the Cardiff and District Auxiliary organisation's annual meeting; others in attendance included the Reverend Daniel Jones, J B Myers from the Baptist Mission House and Mrs Williamson from the Zenana Mission.

== Final days ==
Joseph Fuller died on 11 December 1908, and was buried at Abney Park Cemetery in Stoke Newington, London, the resting place of two English missionaries to Jamaica whom he had known in his youth, Thomas Burchell and Samuel Oughton. His address to the Baptist Union in Cambridge was recently reproduced in Black Voices, a compendium of black Christian writing introduced by the Rt Revd John Sentamu, Archbishop of York.

His papers are held at Oxford University.

== See also ==
- List of slaves
