= Elame a Doo =

Elame a Doo was a ruler of the Bonapriso sublineage of the Duala people who lived on the Wouri estuary of Cameroon in the late 19th century. He was the son of Doo a Priso and a grandson of Priso a Doo. Elame signed the 1884 German-Duala treaty that granted the German Empire sovereignty over Cameroon.
