= Ngombe =

Ngombe may refer to:

- Ngombe language, a Bantu language spoken in the Democratic Republic of Congo
- a population of the Bangandu language spoken in the Central African Republic
- William II of Bimbia (birth name Ngombe), 19th-century Cameroonian king
