= Ngomba =

Ngomba may be,

- Ngomba language
- Ngomba Bila (William II of Bimbia)
