= Angua =

Angua may refer to:

- Angua, a gram panchayat of Dantan I in Kharagpur, Paschim Medinipur, West Bengal, India
- Kwane a Ngie, an 18th-century ruler of Cameroon known in British records as "Angua"
- Delphine Angua von Uberwald, a fictional character in Terry Pratchett's Ankh-Morpork City Watch
