= Ewonde a Kwane =

Ewonde a Kwane was a Duala ruler of the Bonambela/Akwa lineage who lived in Douala on the Wouri River (modern Cameroon). Ewonde was the son of the powerful chief Kwane a Ngie (known in British records as Angua or Quan). Ewonde died early, causing a secession crisis in Bonambela. Ngando a Kwa claimed to be his heir and declared himself equal to Bele a Doo, leader of the Bonanjo/Bell lineage. Ewonde's daughter Kanya married Enjobe, an Aboh slave or immigrant in Douala. Their son would found the Bonambele/Deido sublineage. Duala tradition states that another of Ewonde's daughters, Lesenge, married into Isubu royalty and was the mother of King William of Bimbia.
