= Mbongo =

Mbongo (also called Mbengo, Nambongo, and Nembongo) is the common ancestor of the Sawa peoples of Cameroon according to their oral traditions. Sawa genealogies usually place Mbongo at the head of the lineage. Mbongo's son, usually given as Mbedi a Mbongo, lived at Piti, Cameroon on the Dibamba River. From there, Mbongo's grandsons migrated south toward the coast to found the various Sawa ethnic groups. Some stories make these migrants Mbongo's sons rather than grandsons.

Mbongo does not seem to be a historical figure. Rather, he is a symbol of the ancient past and an inhabitant of a mythological age. Edwin Ardener calls him a "shadowy" figure and ascribes him to a "proto-tradition" of the coastal peoples. Edwin Ardener and Shirley Ardener place Mbongo in the "legendary or mythical stratum" of Sawa oral histories.

The Sawa highly esteem descent from Mbongo as a marker of ethnic inclusion. A Bakweri honorific, mokpel'anembongo, translates as "free-born and descended from Mbongo". Edwin Ardener proposes that the names of many of Cameroon's coastal ethnic groups historically derived from the name Mbongo. For example, in 1668, a Dutch writer named O. Dapper, drawing from the records of Samuel Blommaert, described a people called the Kalbongos at the Rio del Rey: "The people who live higher up the river [from a coastal trading settlement], by them called Kalbongos, are bold men, but villainous rogues." Dapper also recorded names such as Kalbanges, which may also derive from some form of Mbongo's name. A later writer, John Barbot, wrote,

The lands opposite to the latter places, on the north of Rio Camerones, are inhabited by the Calbonges, . . . a strong and lusty people very knavish and treacherous dealers, and miserably poor, continually at war with the Camerones Blacks, living higher on that river, governed by a chief or their own tribe, called by them Moneba . . . . "

The name of Old Calabar, known as Calborch to the Dutch, may also derive from Calbongo, and ultimately Mbongo.
