= Monneba =

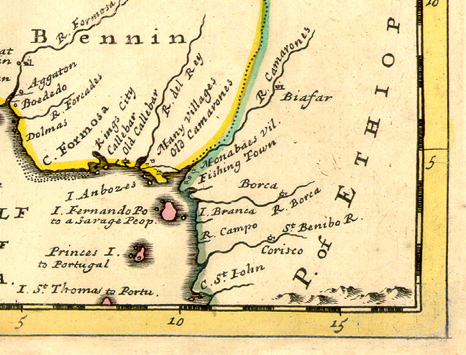
Detail from an English map of 1729 showing "Monabaes vil." on the River Cameronis.

Monneba, also spelled Moneba and other ways, (fl. c. 1630) was a local Duala leader on the Cameroon coast in the 1630s. Dutch sources from the 1660s say that Monneba ran a trading post on the Cameroons River (the Wouri) at the present location of Douala. His people dealt primarily in ivory, with some slaves. Modern scholars equate Monneba with a Duala ruler named Mulobe a Ewale or Mulabe a Ewale. Assuming this is true, he is the earliest Duala leader of whom we have corroboration in written sources. It is quite possible that Monneba/Mulobe was the ruler who set into motion the transformation of the Duala into a trading people and the most influential ethnic group in early Cameroonian history.

== Monneba in European sources ==
Dutch sources from the early 17th century provide some insight into nascent European trade on the Cameroons River (Wouri) at the present site of Douala. Arnout Leers, probably drawing from writings by Samuel Blommaert in the 1630s, is the first writer to mention Monneba:

There is little [to pay] at Rio Cameronis so the following should be noted, otherwise the Negros will make demands as unreasonable as they usually do. When you are in the river off the village, which is four [Dutch] miles up, in order to trade, the chief (oppersten) Monneba comes on board. You give him one iron bar and two copper bars. He is satisfied with this—if you want to give more you can.

Euro-Cameroon trade was in its infancy, and these customs duties indicate that Monneba's trading post was of lesser import than that of a leader called Samson (probably an Ibibio) on the Rio del Rey farther north. Rulers farther south in Gaboon (Gabon) received even more custom.

Dutch maps from the 1650s clearly label Monneba's Village (Monna Baes dorp [sic]), located on the site of Belltown in Douala. The maps also place Monneba's name on the Dibamba River, which is called Monneba's Creek or Channel (Monnebasa Gat).

O. Dapper writing in 1668 (also drawing from Blommaert) explains that by that date Samson had been driven out by "those of Ambo" (Ambas Bay) and Monneba had become the lead trader in the region:

. . . [They are] under a headman (Opper-hooft) called Monneba, who is taken to be the strongest of the princes round about. The village where the headman has his residence, lies upon a height, which has a very tidy cover of natural vegetation, and it is taken to be the pleasantest spot in the whole bight.

Dapper also describes Monneba's people:

On the north bank of the river Kamarones live very many people, called Kalbanges, who wage war against those above (tegen tie van bovenen), there the trade takes place. These Kalbangen are subject to a head (Opperhooft) named Monneba.

By this time, Dutch trade on the Guinea coast had been regularised, and ships carried detailed instructions for reaching the various trading posts, including Monneba's Village. Nevertheless, trade remained minimal and infrequent.

As late as 1739, letters and ships' logs show that Dutch merchants on the Cameroon coast were trading almost solely with the Duala in their settlement on the Wouri, which they still referred to as "Monneba's Village". Trade was mostly in ivory, with some slaves. Monneba himself was still thought to be the ruler there, as Bardot wrote in 1732 (probably using Dapper as the source): "The lands opposite to the latter places, on the north of Rio Camerones, are inhabited by the Calbonges, . . . governed by a chief of their own tribe, called by them Moneba . . . ." Not until King Joss in the late 1780s do European sources name another ruler from the Douala area.

== Connection with Mulobe a Ewale ==
Edwin Ardener equates Monneba with the Duala leader referred to in traditional genealogies as Mulobe a Ewale or Mulabe a Ewale. This individual is placed one generation after Ewale a Mbedi, the eponymous father of the Duala people. Later academics Austen and Derrick accept the Monneba/Mulabe connection as "very reasonable".

There is no doubt that Monneba's Village is in fact Douala. The location on Dutch maps is clearly on the Wouri River at about the location of Belltown, one of the various townships that made up Douala in the precolonial period. Leers and Blommaert give examples of the language spoken by Monneba and his people, and it is obviously that of the Duala. The connection also makes temporal sense. If one starts from the first incontestable Duala leaders known from modern sources and traces their purported genealogy back allowing 25 years for each generation, Mulobe seems to have lived at the same time Dutch sources first mention Monneba.
