= John Clarke (Baptist missionary) =

English Baptist minister and missionary (1802–1879)

John Clarke (1802 – 1879) was an English Baptist minister and missionary, who served in Jamaica and Fernando Po (an island off the coast of West Africa). He is the author of a collection of comparative vocabulary in numerous West African languages, published in 1848/9, as well as a grammar of the Fernandian (Bube) language of Fernando Po.

Clarke first went to Jamaica in 1829 and worked as a teacher and Baptist minister in Kingston, Spanish Town, and elsewhere until 1840, when he was sent with George K. Prince to investigate the possibilities of founding a mission in West Africa. They landed in Fernando Po in January 1841. In 1842, Clarke went back to Jamaica and England to recruit volunteers for the mission, returning in February 1844 with a party of Jamaican teachers and settlers, among them the 18-year-old Joseph Jackson Fuller, who was later to become famous himself as a missionary.

The mission on the island of Fernando Po was not a success, and was eventually forced to close in 1858, mainly due to restrictions from the Spanish authorities, who claimed the island and were determined to make it Catholic; but the mission which the Baptists founded on the Cameroonian mainland opposite the island survived until it was taken over by the Basel Mission Society in 1886. Clarke himself became ill and in 1847 he and his wife went back to Jamaica, and then in 1848 to England. After a time he returned to Jamaica, where he lived and worked for the rest of his life.

John Clarke got married in Berwick-upon-Tweed to a wife, Margaret, from that town in 1829, shortly before setting out for Jamaica. They remained together for more than 40 years until she died. Two of their children died in childhood, but a daughter survived.

== Bibliography ==
- Clarke, John (1846). Sentences in the Fernandian Tongue. Dunfermline Press, Bimbia.
- Clarke, John (1848). Introduction To The Fernandian Tongue, Part 1. Berwick-on-Tweed.
- Clarke, John (1848/9). Specimens Of Dialects, Short Vocabularies Of Languages: And Notes Of Countries And Customs In Africa.
- Clarke, John (1850). Memoir of Richard Merrick. (Followed by) Memoir of Joseph Merrick. London.
- Clarke, John (1877). Autobiographical letter to Rev. James Hume. Published online by Michael Brown Rare Books.
- Dekar, Paul R. (2001). "Jamaican and British Baptists in West Africa 1841–1888". Missiology: An International Review 29(4), pp. 433–447.
- Hair, P. E. H. (1966). "An Introduction to John Clarke's "Specimens of Dialects" 1848/9.". Sierra Leone Language Review, 5, 1966, pp. 72–82.
- Newman, Las (2001). "A West Indian Contribution to Christian Mission in Africa: The career of Joseph Jackson Fuller (1845-1888)". Transformation, Vol. 18, No. 4 (October 2001), pp. 220–231.
