= Pongo language =

Dialect of the Duala language

Pongo is a dialect of the Duala language, spoken on the coast of Cameroon, in the district of Dibombari, by the Pongo tribe. It belongs to the Bantu languages, Code A26 according to Guthrie classification.

== Description ==
The Pongo language is, according to dialectometrics data, closest to the Douala standard, with which it seems to share nearly 95% of its basic vocabulary. Both languages are mutually intelligible despite some difficulties on the Douala side due to limited exposure to the Pongo dialect. The Douala dialect is used as a lingua franca in the Littoral region between members of the Sawabantu ethnic group. The standard Douala has been used to evangelize in the region and is the preferred language of the Makossa musical genre.

== Geography ==
The town of Dibombari is the centre of Pongo. This area is located north of the city of Douala, above the Bonabéri district. The term "Pongo" is also used to designate the north cardinal point in Douala. There, the Pongo tribe coexists with other ethnic groups such as the Bankon and the Mpoo.

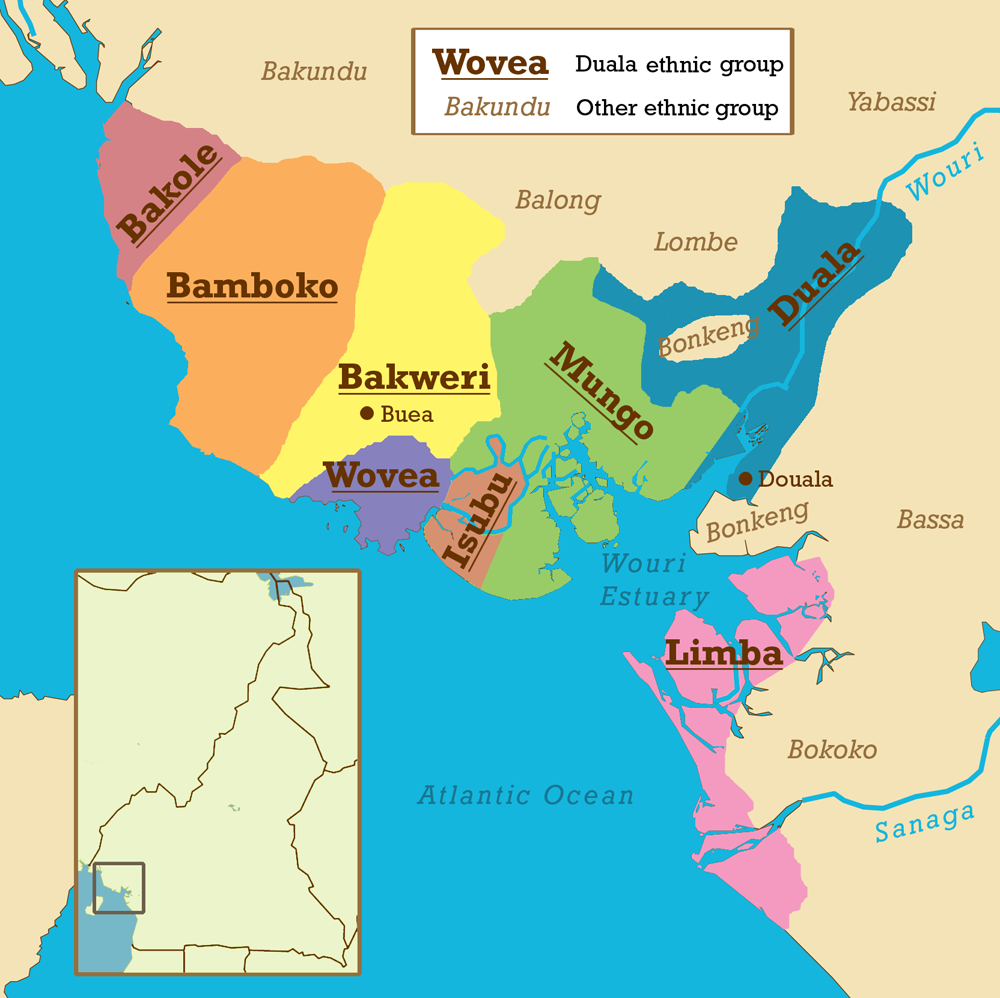
The Pongo Tribe (Mungo), shown in green.

== Grammar ==
Pongo differs from Duala in the use of the verb èndè instead of the verb wala (to go), unusual in Douala, which serves as an auxiliary verb in the future tense in both languages. Another noticeable difference is the use of the conjunction ndi ("but") instead of ndé and a tendency to favor the phoneme / d / over / l /. For example: Ekwali, written Ekwadi ("History") in Douala, becomes systematically Ekwadi in Pongo. In addition, the Douala prefix ma, usually placed before the basic form of the verb, is replaced by an n', in Pongo. An example is the Douala sentence "di ma topo, ndé ba bato si ma senga", which becomes in Pongo "di n'topo Di, ndi ba bato n'senga" "we talk, but people do not listen."

== Vocabulary ==
Comparative glossary of Douala and Pongo dialects. Boxes with two words indicate that these words are both present in the dialect and that they are interchangeable.

Pongo Word	Douala Word	English Translation
Dinga	Linga, dinga	to get mad
moopo, mulopo	mulopo	head
ilèndi	diwèndi	knife
ikom (plural:lokom), dikom	dikom (plural, makom)	friend(s)
budu	bulu, budu	night
djibö	don	Market
djibö	dibö	beach
mudjodi (plural : midjodi)	mudongo (plural : midongo)	hill, mountain
eka, enka	nika, ninka	thus, this way
mwato (plural : baato)	muto (pluriel : bito)	Woman
sèkibanè	sèkèméyè	to shake something
ilodi	idodi	Filariasis
mwéma	mulema	heart
mö	mö	him, her
yö	mö	it
ëndë, wala	wala	to go
mpèlè	mpöm	uniqueness
na bodi	na boli, na bodi	I did
ndi, nde	nde	but
yöngö (pluriel : löngö)	wöngö (pluriel : löngö)	pot
