= Alfred Saker =

British missionary

Alfred James Lymmonds Saker
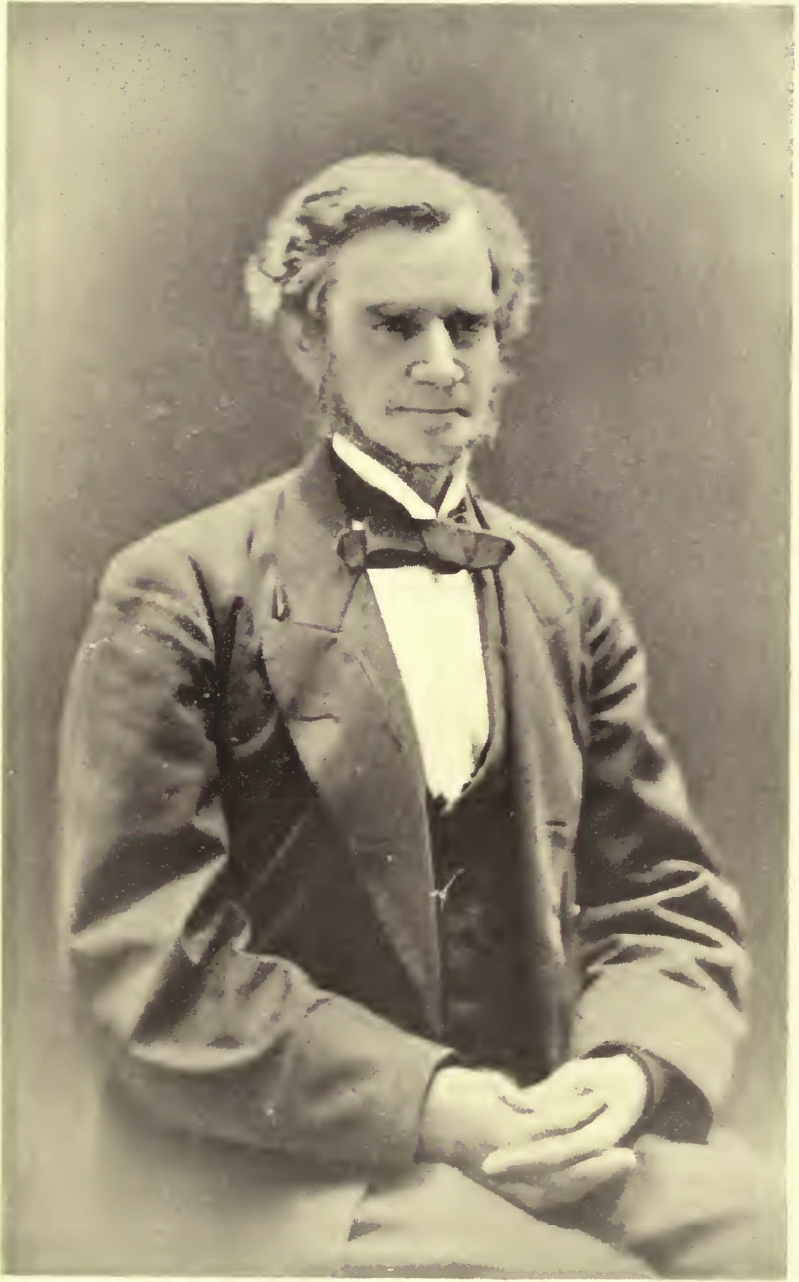
- Born: 28 July 1814; Wrotham, Kent, United Kingdom
- Died: 12 March 1880 (aged 65)
- Known for: Missionary in Cameroon, Africa
- Spouse: Sarah Ann Helen Jessup (1816-1886)

Alfred Saker (21 July 1814 in Wrotham, Kent – 12 March 1880 in Peckham) was a British Baptist missionary of the Baptist Missionary Society. In 1858 he led a Baptist Mission that relocated from the then Spanish island of Fernando Po and landed in Cameroon (Kamerun). According to the record, he bought land from indigenous Bimbia chiefs, established a seaside settlement christened Victoria after the reigning British Empress. The settlement was renamed Limbe by decree in 1982 by President Ahmadou Ahidjo of Cameroon.

Alfred Saker wished to be known under no other designation than a "Missionary to Africa".

He was a leader of the early British Baptist missionaries that established churches on Fernando Po Island and Cameroon. His 1844-1876 mission work included translation - between 1862 and 1872 - of the Bible into the Duala language.

== Biography ==
=== Early life and consecration (1841 - 1842) ===
Birthplace – Childhood – Youth
Alfred Saker was born on 21 July 1814 in Borough Green, in Wrotham, Kent. His father was a millwright and engineer, and the parent of a large family of children, many of whom died in infancy. Alfred was a weakly babe. His parents could afford only to send him to the National School of the place. He early showed a great love for books. He later entered his father's workshop, carrying with him a thirst for knowledge, study and books. Before he was sixteen, he had constructed a small steam-engine.

Conversion – Devotion to Christ
There was, indeed, a small Baptist chapel in the hamlet. Alfred Saker's mind was not on the Gospel. One Sabbath evening he was strolling alone through the street, when the singing in a chapel that he passed drew his attention. He entered. He assisted in the choir, and as his gifts drew attention, he was prompt to exercise them in the cottages and hamlets around. He took an active part in every good work. On 4 January 1834, at 19 years old, he was baptized by Mr. Fremling, of Foots cray, and became a member of the church in the village of his nativity. With the public devotion of himself to Christ, he began to extend his labours in every direction. His evenings were either given to self-improvement or he would go to some member's house, where a few lowly people were gathered for converse and prayer. His fitness for evangelistic service became more and more apparent. Not a village or hamlet in the neighbour¬hood was left untouched by his zealous ministrations. This, perhaps, may be regarded as the beginning of his ministry. It was a voluntary movement on his part. The church soon called him to exercise his ministry in a more formal way, and for some time, at their request, he occupied every other Sabbath the little chapel at Plaxtol.

Dockyard at Devonport – Marriage

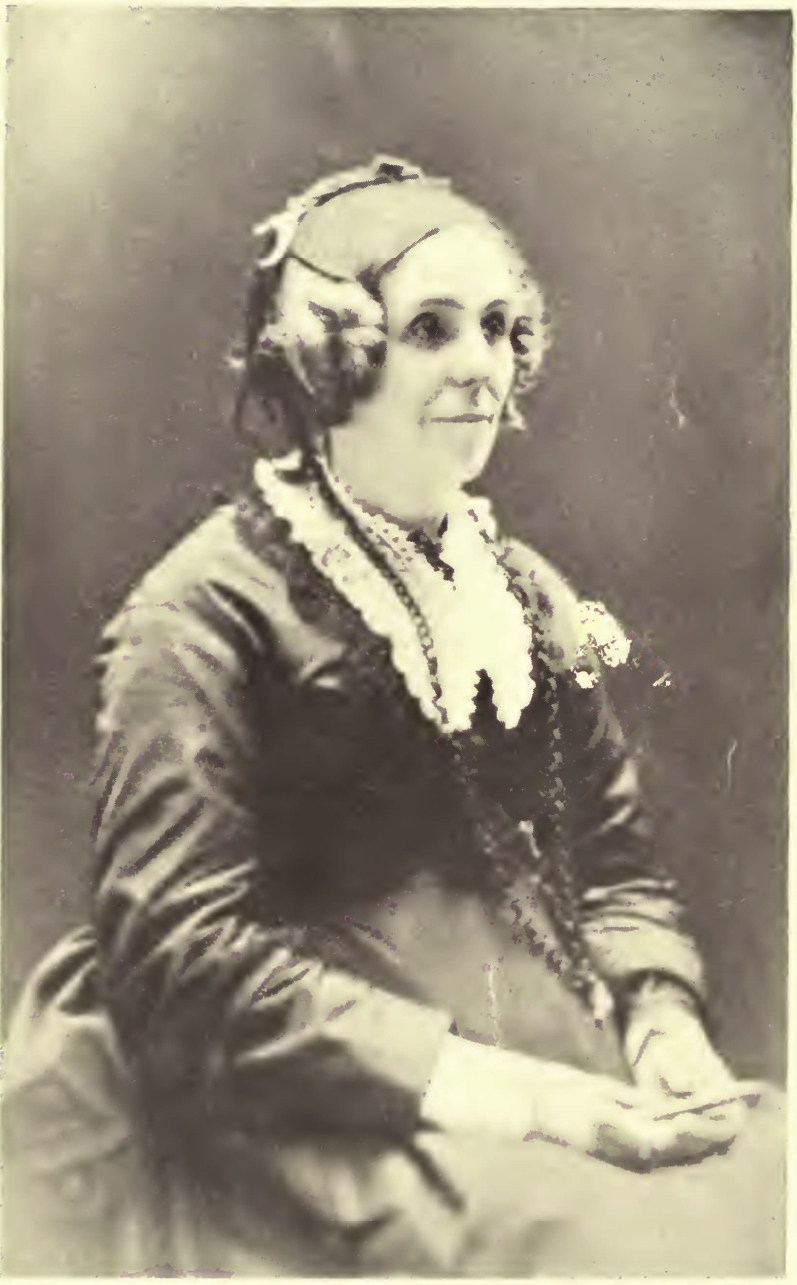
Mrs Saker, portrayed in her daughter's book

The death of his father, in 1838, led Saker to seek employment elsewhere. He applied at various dockyards, and was appointed in Devonport, preparing drawings for the Admiralty. In October 1839, he was sent for nine months to the dockyard at Deptford, to superintend the erection of machinery. In February 1840, in St Marys, Newington, London, he was married to Helen Jessup and returned to Devonport.

Desire for a missionary life
In the early days of his Christian life, he had formed the desire to consecrate his powers to the service of Christ in Africa. He owed much to his highly esteemed pastor, the Rev. Thos. Horton. In this wish he was encouraged by his devoted wife. In 1843, with his wife, he was hired as a missionary by the Baptist Missionary Society and took a ship to Jamaica, before arriving at Port Clarence (Malabo) on Fernando Poo (island of Bioko, Equatorial Guinea) in 1844. It was the purpose of the missionary executive to use a small steamer in connection with mission work and Mr. Saker went out in the position of assistant missionary, combining with that the duties of engineer.

=== Mission ===
Origin of the African Mission & The exploration

The Act of Emancipation in Jamaica drove numbers of the freed Africans to Gospel the light of life to the land of their fathers, the Dark Continent. Other British candidates like Rev. Joseph. Merrick, with their families, were examined and accepted. In 1845, he joined Douala in Cameroon and founded a school there.

=== Jamaican Baptist Mission to Eq. Guinea and Cameroon ===
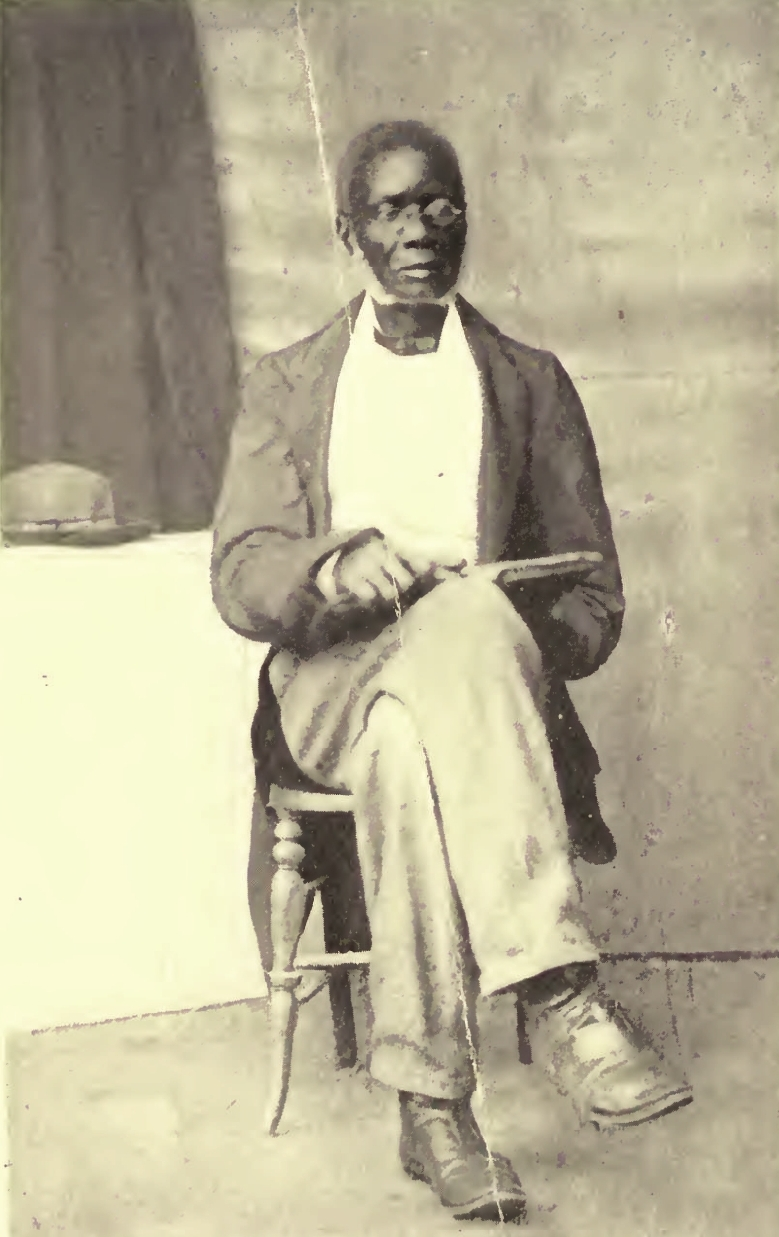
Joseph Wilson, The first convert in Fernando Po

In Jamaica, there was an end to slavery. A number of ex-slaves who had become Christians decided to become missionaries in Africa. So began the Jamaican Baptist Missionary Society work in 1843, in Fernando Po, today Equatorial Guinea near the coast of Cameroon.

In 1849, Saker founded Bethel Baptist Church.

In 1853, the Spanish government, instigated by the Jesuit missionaries, insisted on the departure of the Baptists from Fernando Po, and suppressed all Protestant worship. The converts resolved to accompany their teachers, and the whole Baptist community removed under Mr. Saker's guidance to Amboises Bay, on the mainland. He purchased a tract of land on the coast from the Bimbia chief, and mapped out the new colony of Victoria. Under his energetic superintendence and untiring personal labor the ground was soon covered with houses and gardens for the exiles. Mr. Saker's influence upon the native chiefs and their people was most successfully exercised in suppressing many of their cruel and sanguinary customs. Indeed, if he had chosen, he might have made himself their king in the later years of his residence among them. Although he lived so long in a climate deadly to Europeans, he suffered greatly from fever and debility.

Shortly after his arrival at Fernando Po, the headquarters of the Baptist missionaries, he visited the tribes on the mainland at the mouth of the Cameroons River. Here he built a house suitable for the work, with his own hands, and gradually acquired acquaintance with the language of the people. Within two years of the commencement of his labors he had reduced their language to writing and prepared a lesson-book for the school which he had formed. With the printing-press and material sent to him by the church at Devonport he printed schoolbooks for the use of his scholars and portions of the New Testament.

In 1849, the church at Cameroons was formed, and a Christian civilization began to spread itself there through Mr. Saker's efforts. He induced the people to labor with something like regularity in agriculture, introducing various plants, such as bread-fruit, mangoes, oranges, and other fruits and vegetables for daily sustenance. These productions, moreover, enabled them to obtain manufactured articles from the ships frequenting the river, and in the course of a few years a civilized community was established. He taught his converts the industrial arts, and soon found himself surrounded by artisans of all sorts, carpenters, smiths, bricklayers, etc. The more forward scholars soon became helpful in the printing-office work, and aided in the translation and printing of the Scriptures in the Duala tongue, which was his lifelong task.

In 1851, the mission was reduced by death to such a degree that not a single fellow-laborer remained of those who went out with him, except one or two colored brethren. All his European colleagues were gone, and he was left alone. Hitherto he had been in a subordinate position, but now from necessity he was obliged to take the lead.

In 1858, the Spanish authorities expelled the Protestant missionaries from Fernando Po and Alfred Saker returned to the mainland with a group of liberated slaves, and bought a large tract of land (16 km x 8 km) from King William of Bimbia. The small group built a school, a church, and other buildings for the mission, thereby founding the city of Victoria, now Limbé (since 1982). They also faced problems of health or the hostility of the population. They opened churches, dispensaries and centers of care and trained a great number of Cameroonian pastors, tailors, shoe-makers, masons and carpenters who helped them build the Church of Béthel in 1860.

=== Lifetime work : Bible translation in Duala ===
In 1847, the Jamaican Joseph Merrick had completed a translation of the Gospel of Matthew into the Isubu language. A year later Saker himself started a translation in Douala. In 1872 he had the whole Bible translated in this language and 200 copies were printed at his own press. In the meantime, Saker established a European settlement named Victoria. The Protestant missionaries were forced to leave the Roman Catholic Spanish island of Fernando Po and could now join forces with Saker from this settlement.

=== Working with fellow missionaries ===
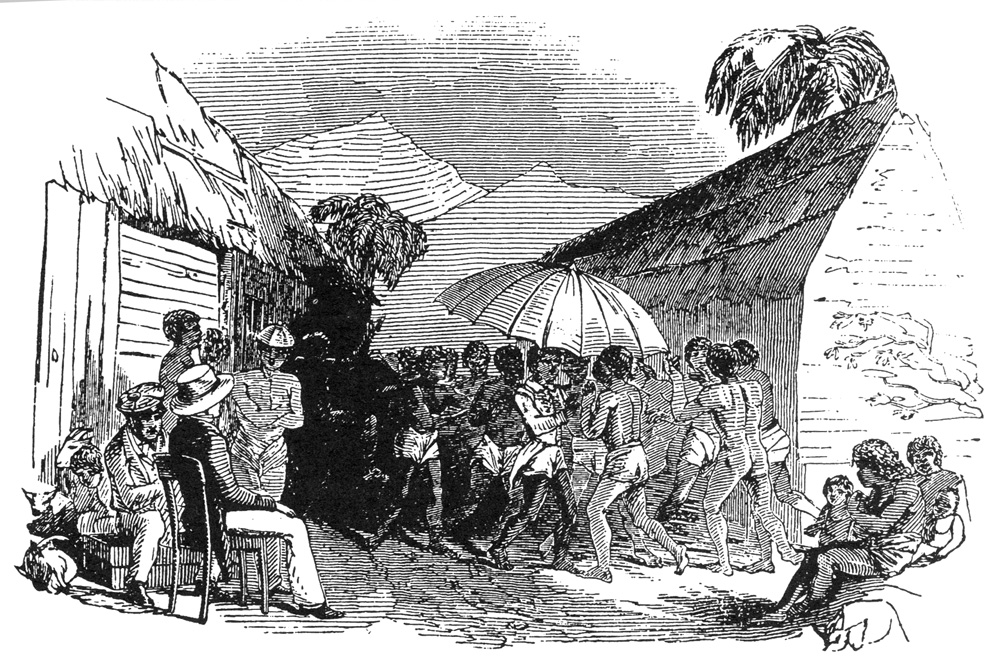
Joseph Merrick at an Isubu funeral, Limbe (1845).

One of the fascinating things in the work of Saker was working with people from Jamaica. Joseph Merrick can be seen as the pioneer of the work in Cameroon. He had a talent for learning languages and within a short time he preached in Isubu and Douala. He died on the way to Jamaica in the year 1849.

=== Tensions with missionaries and country peoples ===
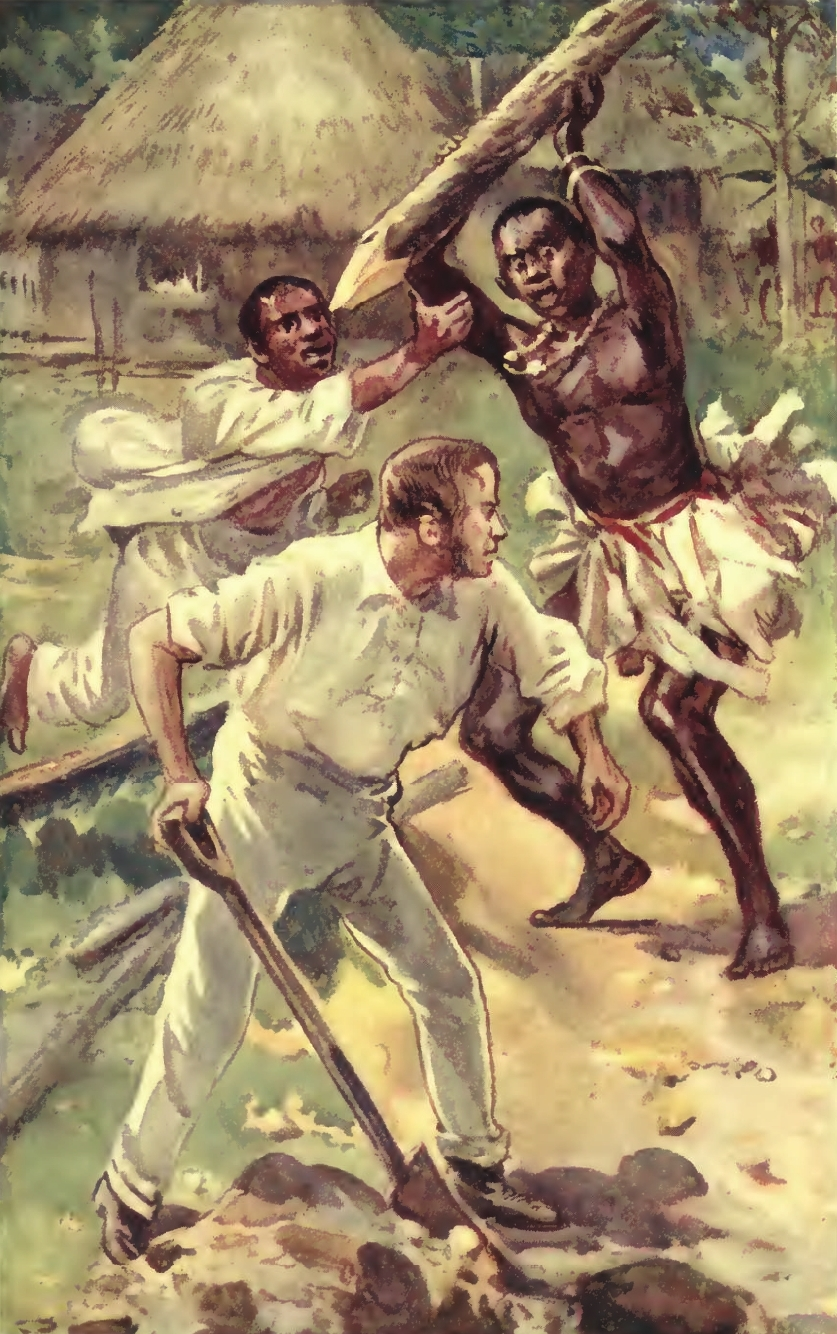
The Conflicts with country peoples

Another Jamaican was Rev. Joseph Jackson Fuller (1825-1908), born into slavery in Jamaica. In 1850 he was accepted as a missionary and eight years later he became pastor. Fuller wrote in the period in Fernando Po about tensions between the whites from England and the former slaves from Jamaica.

The British showed themselves in a paternalistic attitude and a certain degree of cultural domination. Fuller realized a lot of work in education, oversaw the printing and negotiated with the local king. He also translated the book Pilgrims Progress in Douala. He left Cameroon in 1888 and until his death he lived in England.

Although all the missionaries of the Baptist Missionary Society were in theory equal, there was nevertheless differences. For example, in the wages: in 1863 Saker received £250 pound, Fuller £125 and Rev. Johnson, the first baptized by Saker, 100 pounds.

There were complaints about the actions of Saker from the local believers, but also a Scottish missionary protested his actions. After investigation the missionary organization said Saker was not guilty, however, the way he his treated the local believers had to change. The Scottish missionary was fired. This was of the opinion that the three performance Saker - Bible translation, printing and the foundation of Victoria - had been largely due to Merrick and Fuller.

=== Less contrast ===
By the end of the 1870s Saker stopped his work and returned to his homeland, where he died in 1880. The history of Alfred Saker shows a less black and white picture than seen on the memorial in Limbe.

=== Geographical discoveries ===
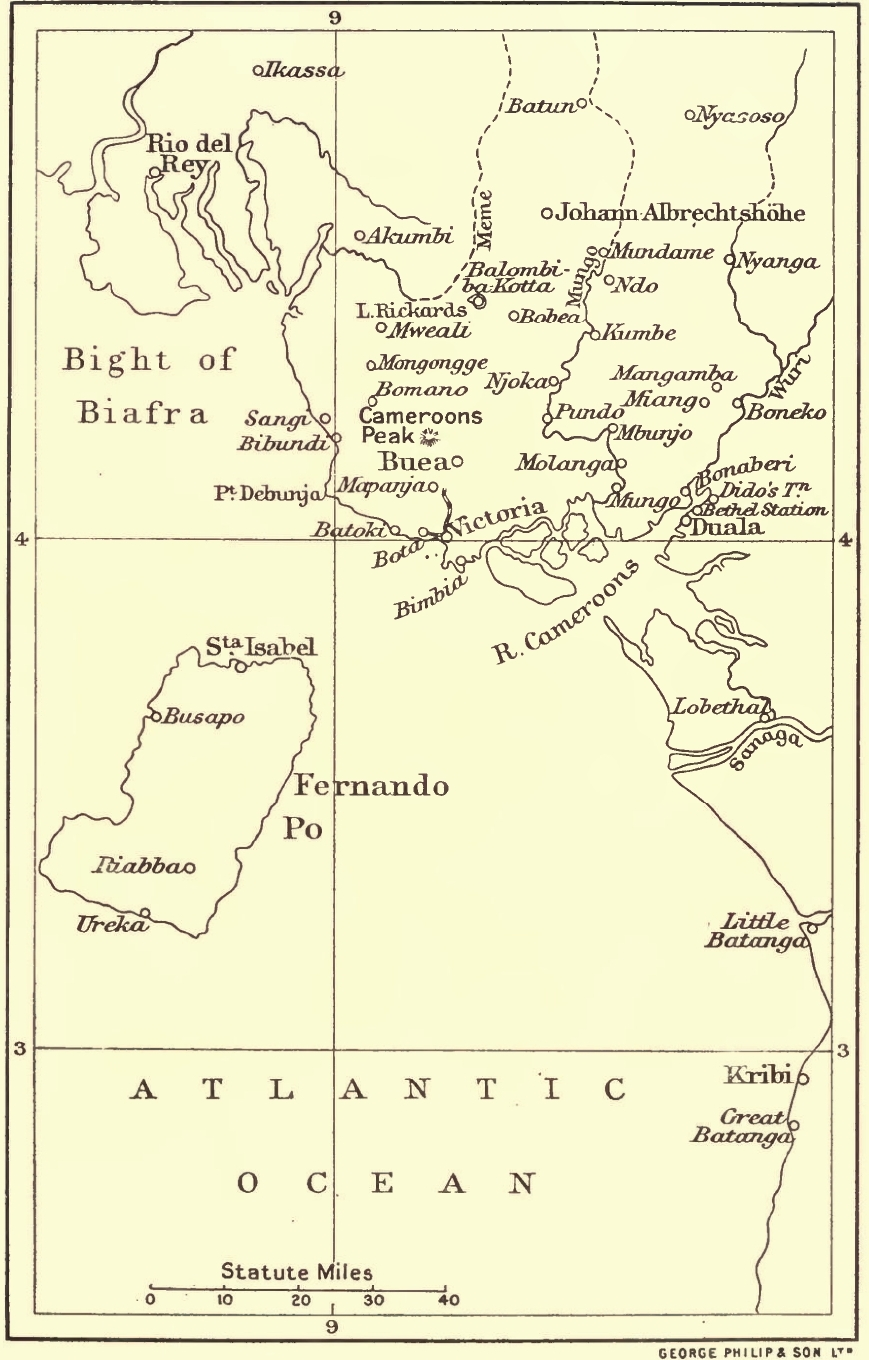
The Cameroons that Saker laboured

== Family life ==
He has been supported during his mission by his wife and kids.

== Legacy ==
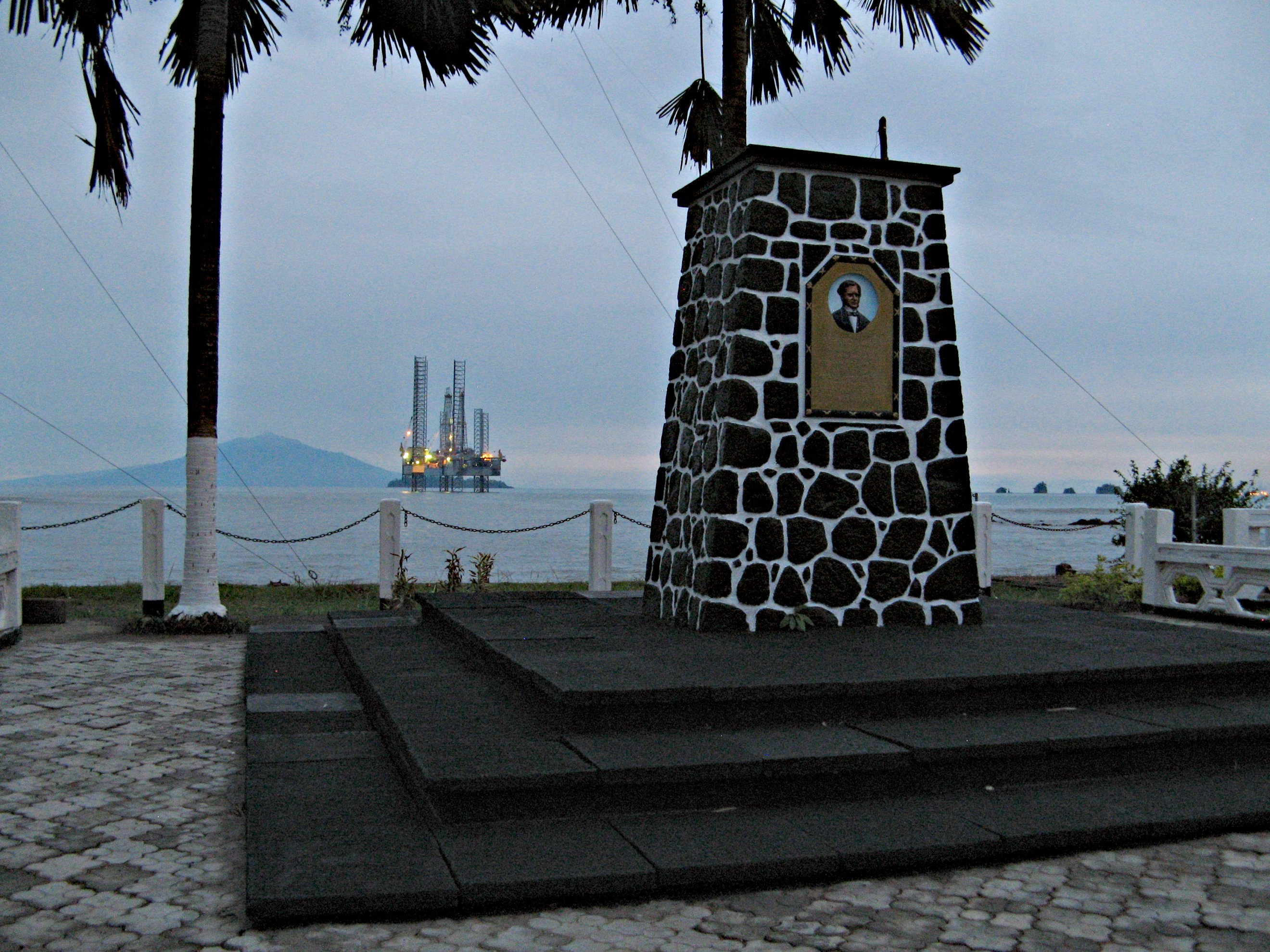
Alfred Saker, Missionary to Africa, who landed, founded and named the Township Victoria. Tablet erected in memory of his devoted work to mark the Centenary of Victoria, 1858-1958

Alfred Saker first went to Africa in 1844 as part of a missionary team on the island of Fernando Po (now Bioko). He was, in the opinion of David Livingstone, the most important English missionary in West Africa. He envisioned great possibilities and tried to convince the English government to make this area a Crown Colony. He established his first missionary station on the continent near present-day Douala, Cameroon, in 1845. He founded the city of Victoria, Cameroon, and translated the Bible into Douala, the local language.

== Places named in his honour and other memorials ==
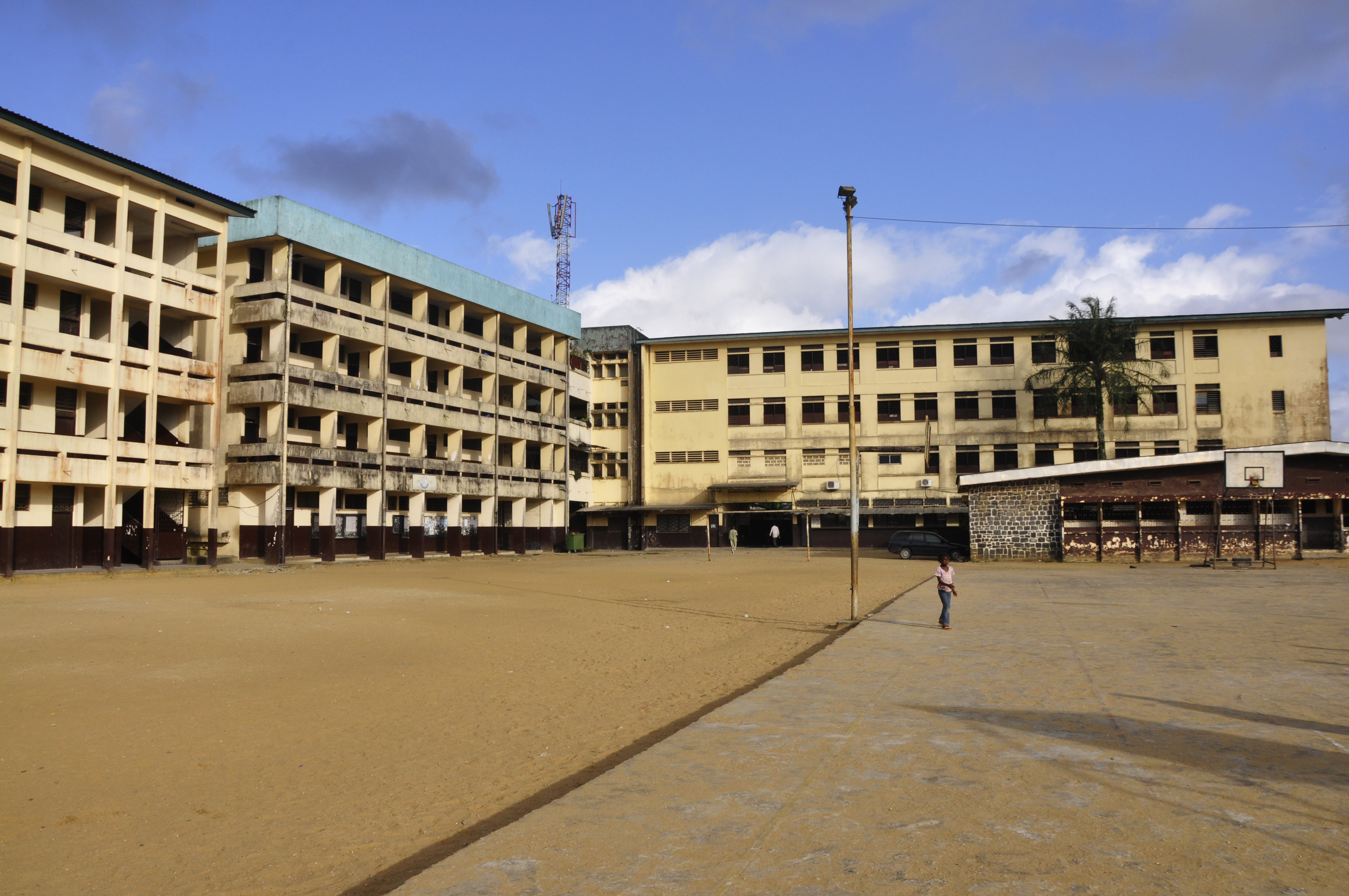
Alfred Saker College, Douala

=== In Cameroon ===
==== Limbe ====
- A Baptist school, Saker Baptist College, is named after him.
- Alfred Saker Baptist Church

==== Douala ====
- College Alfred Saker Deïdo
- Alfred Saker street in Douala

Bibliographic sources

- Underhill, Edward Bean (1813-1901). Alfred Saker (1814-1880), missionary to Africa : a biography, (1884) London: Baptist Missionary Society (in English)
- Emily Martha Ashfield Saker, b. 1849. Alfred Saker The Pioneer of the Cameroons, (1908), London : Religious Tract Society ISBN 1 175 69259 X
- Jaap Van Slageren. Les origines de l'Église évangélique du Cameroun

== Notes and references ==
Citations
