= Ewale a Mbedi =

Ewale a Mbedi was the eponymous ancestor of the Duala people of Cameroon (named for a variant spelling of his name, Dwala). According to the oral histories of the Duala and related Sawa peoples of the Cameroon coast, Ewale hailed from a place called Piti. He and his followers migrated southwest to the coast and settled at the present-day location of Douala. The area was inhabited by the Bassa and/or Bakoko, who were driven inland by the new arrivals. Meanwhile, Ewale and his followers set up trade with European merchant ships.

Historians and anthropologists find Ewale's existence and major deeds to be mostly plausible. The stories lack overt mythological elements, and the genealogies of the rulers of the Duala place Ewale at a feasible distance before historical Duala chiefs and kings. The most reasonable estimation places the migration from Piti in the late 16th century. Although many of the stories ascribe this move to a desire to trade with Europeans on the coast, a more likely reason may be that Piti had simply become too crowded. Driving away the Bassa and Bakoko is believable in that these peoples were farmers, not traders or fishermen, so a coastal homeland was not a necessity for them.

== Narratives ==
Ewale a Mbedi's life and ancestry are known only from the oral histories of the Duala and other Sawa ethnic groups in the Cameroon littoral, the details of which vary greatly from story to story. According to some narratives, Ewale travelled north from the Bakota region of the lower Congo. He had reached the lower Sanaga River when a fight with family members drove him yet farther north to Piti. However, other stories make this migration to Piti the work of Ewale's father, Mbedi.

All tales agree that Ewale travelled from Piti to the present location of Douala on the Cameroon coast. However, the impetus for this move varies from source to source. One common reason given is that Ewale hoped to set up trade relations with European merchants on the coast. Alternately, Ewale may have wanted to trade fish with the coastal Bakoko. Another variant states that Ewale and members of his family had a dispute. Depending on the tale, this was over something as simple as a chicken and a canoe prow to a fight with Ewale's uncle, Ngasse, whose daughter Ewale married against his uncle's wishes. This led to war, during which all of Mbedi's offspring were driven from Piti. Yet another story says that Ewale fought with his father over cloth imported from European coastal traders. A version from Lungassi near Piti claims that the inhabitants of that village drove the Duala from Piti. Various Sawa coastal ethnic groups claim descent from Ewale's siblings, whom they claim accompanied him on his trek.

The tales state that Douala was then home to the Bassa and/or Bakoko ethnic groups. According to most versions of the story, Ewale settled among these peoples and somehow drove them away through non-violent means. This feat is often attributed to various ruses. For example, one tale says that Ewale and his followers hid their true numbers as they settled the area only to take control through their trading activities. A Bassa version of the story says that Ewale tricked the Bassa into believing he was a sorcerer, scaring them inland. A Bakoko variant says that Ewale and his followers sneaked into the area and killed the Bakoko in their sleep.

Trade with Europeans features prominently in the Ewale narratives, a development that is said to have split the early Duala settlers. According to many of the stories, Ewale and his brother, Bojongo a Mbedi, disagreed over how to react to the European traders. One version says that Bojongo tried to fight them, while Ewale traded instead; according to another, the Europeans killed Bojongo. A Duala proverb sums up the Bojongo tales: "Bojongo found the Europeans, Bonambela [Duala] took them over." The Ewale/trade connection is also present in several tales about Ewale's son, Mapoka, who is said to have travelled to Europe. The more traditional accounts place Mapoka several generations later than Ewale, however.

== Historicity ==
Historians and anthropologists such as Edwin Ardener, Ralph A. Austen, and Jonathan Derrick suggest that the Ewale narrative is "quite plausible because it is not very pretentious in either chronological or ideological terms." The gap between Ewale and the first Duala leaders corroborated in European sources is logically sound and does not suggest a great deal of mythology. Nor is Ewale an obviously mythologised heroic figure. Nevertheless, Ewale occupies a nebulous position between history and myth, meaning that he may have been several generations further into the past than modern Duala oral histories place him.

Dutch traders reached the Cameroon coast in the early 17th century. They traded with a leader named Monneba, whom Ardener and others equate with Ewale's son from the Duala genealogy, Mulobe a Ewale. Based on this inference, Ewale's migration from Piti may be dated to the late 16th century, a point just prior to the first European explorers reaching the coast of Cameroon.

Many tales give the reason behind Ewale's migration as his desire to trade with the Europeans. Ardener and Ardener do not dismiss this hypothesis, and Ewale may very well have encountered European merchants and become the first Duala leader to establish trade ties with them. However, Austen and Derrick doubt that trade was the motivation for Ewale's exodus from Piti. No traders had yet begun operations on the Cameroon coast in the late 16th century. Instead, Ewale's move from Piti may have been prompted by population pressures; Piti is the site of only a small creek, from which a fishing people such as the Duala would have had a difficult time feeding many mouths. This view finds support in the versions of the tale that ascribe Ewale's departure from Piti to a row with his family, although this reasoning may only be a recasting of the later split of the Duala into the rival Bell and Akwa lineages to a more ancient time.

As for the driving off of the Bassa and Bakoko, these peoples were not fishermen. They were farmers, so getting them to leave the coast and major rivers for the interior would presumably not have been too difficult. The Bassa and Bakoko would have avoided conflict by doing so, and they would be better able to farm in the interior anyway.
