= Johannes Ittmann =

German Protestant missionary

Johannes Ittmann (26 January 1885 – 15 June 1963) was a German Protestant missionary in Cameroon between 1911 and 1940.

He was born in Groß-Umstadt, Grand Duchy of Hesse, German Empire and died in Gambach, Hesse, West Germany. He worked with the Basel Mission in Cameroon from 1911 to 1940. He joined the National Socialist German Workers’ Party in 1934; this membership led to his forced retirement by the Basil Mission, who disagreed with their politics.

He did extensive ethnological and anthropological work in the Southwest Province, an English-speaking part of Cameroon, and published some 1,000 pages about it. His best-known work is his dictionary about the Duala language.

== Publications ==
- Grammatik des Duala, Kamerun (Grammar of Duala, with Carl Meinhof) (1939)
- Sprichwörter der Kundu: (Kamerun): 75 (Veröffentlichung / Deutsche Akademie Der Wissenschaften, Institut Für Orientforschung) (Proverbs of the Kundu)

== Family ==
Ittmann married Hanny Weygandt on August 4, 1914.
