= Saker Baptist College =

- Limbe, South West Region; Cameroon

Information
- Type: Private, All-girls, Boarding school
- Founded: 1962; 64 years ago
- Language: English
- Affiliation: Cameroon Baptist Convention

Saker Baptist College is a Baptist all-girls secondary school located in Limbe, Cameroon. It is affiliated with the Cameroon Baptist Convention.

== History ==
The school was founded in 1962 by Baptist missionaries.

Former students of the school founded an association called ExSSA. On January 27, 2007, this association offered a chapel worth CFA 200 million to the college.

The front of the college was renovated in 2020 as part of a road surfacing initiative.

As of 2020, the school has 749 students.
