= George (Duala king) =

Duala king

George or Joss, born Doo a Makongo or Doo a Mukonga, was a king of the Duala people in the late 18th century. Doo a Makongo was the son of Makongo a Njo. He lived at Douala on the Wouri estuary on the coast of Cameroon. By 1788–1790, Doo was a powerful ruler in the area. During this time, the British slave trade was at its height, and Douala was the primary trading post in the region.

Records of the British trading vessel Sarah in 1790 and records of an English trial in 1788 both give the name of the head trader in Douala as King George. These were likely names given Doo by the traders, who also bestowed on him the title of king (kine in Duala). George possessed kalati, trade books in which credit records were kept and the mark of a major trader in Duala eyes. He received both customs duties and a "dash" (bonus gift). Listed as lesser rulers in the region were Preshaw (Priso a Doo) and Bell (Bele a Doo). Nevertheless, these same British records indicate that a leader named Angua (probably Kwane a Ngie) was actually more powerful. For example, the Sarah's records state that George sold only 40 slaves to Angua's 50, and his "dash" was much smaller.

The succession of George's kingship remained an open question until his death. He disowned his eldest son, Priso a Doo, because of the boy's violent behaviour. In fact, George may have helped European traders capture Priso for murdering some of their compatriots. Bele a Doo was named heir, which was probably the impetus for Ngando a Kwa to declare his independence and set himself up as Bele's equal when Ewonde a Kwane of his own lineage died. Thus, George's death may have been indirectly responsible for the Duala people's split into the rival Bell and Akwa lineages.
