= Subu =

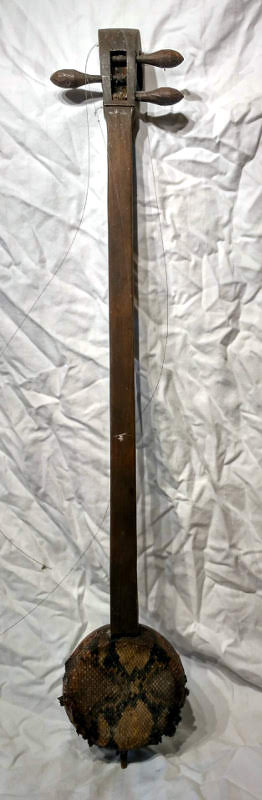

The Subu, Lisu Subu or Sung Lisu is a stringed instrument with a small round body covered in snake skin and a long neck. It has 3 steel strings. It is played in Thailand and Myanmar.
