= William II of Bimbia =

Cameroonian ruler (died 1882)

Young King William, born Ngombe or Ngomb' a Bila (died 1882), was, as William II of Bimbia, the chief and king of Bimbia on the coast of Cameroon and of the Isubu ethnic group who lived there. Young King William inherited a kingdom where power was shifting from the monarchy to wealthy traders, a situation that only grew worse under William II's impotent rule. As competition for European trade among the coastal peoples of Cameroon grew more intense, young King William's rivals multiplied and his centralised authority crumbled. He was murdered in 1882.

== Reign ==
Ngombe was born to King William I of Bimbia. As a Bimbian prince, Ngombe enjoyed a status equal to that of Isubu chiefs. On 31 March 1848, for example, he was among the signatories for an engagement ending human sacrifice in Bimbia. William I died sometime before 1877. Bimbia had been in a state of almost perpetual war since its height in the early 19th century, as rival factions fought for favour with European traders. The power of the Isubu monarchy thus waned as well. Although Ngombe was next in the line of succession, his ascension was opposed by another claimant, known as Yellow Money. Acting Consul Hopkins of Great Britain was called in to settle the dispute, although his degree of input is not known. Ngombe won the contest and was crowned William II of Bimbia.

European traders and missionaries saw the new monarch as, in the words of Baptist missionary Thomas Comber, "a quiet, well-meaning, young man" and dubbed him young King William. Despite his agreeable nature, young William inherited a state in tatters. His difficult accession was a symptom of the many inter-Isubu conflicts that characterised the coast. Wealth had become just as important as heredity in determining social status, which had allowed several rivals to William's primacy to emerge. Sometime in 1878 or 1879, Thomas Comber asked William to prevent a Bimbian man from being hanged for witchcraft. William expressed his agreement that something should be done but stated that he was too afraid to call the chiefs to a palaver in Williamstown, his capital. The king explained that Comber would have to get several other powerful Bimbian chiefs to agree to take action, since they had just as much power as William did.

Another of young William's major concerns was the Europeans' steady push inland. Although most of these explorers were missionaries, William feared that their efforts would result in direct trade with the inland tribes and the elimination of the Isubus' role as middlemen. Baptist missionary Quintin Thomas described a confrontation with the king on a ship awaiting landfall at Bonjongo, a settlement of a rival ethnic group, the inland Bakweris:

A number of people came from Bimbia; young King William came to me and told me they had met and had a big palaver about my being among the Bakweris. A great many wanted to come take me away to Bimbia and make me live there; but he had quieted them, and now he wanted to warn me not to trade with them, and not to spoil their prices. He said he wanted a whiteman [sic] at Bimbia, and I was to see about it.

== Murder and legacy ==
Sometime before 1 December 1882, young King William was murdered in Limbola, a village on the Bimbian coast. King Woloa wo Fike of the Bakweri village Soppo was blamed for ordering the deed. The Bimbian monarchy crumbled completely. No heir could unite all Bimbia under his banner, and Bimbia as a nation essentially ceased to exist. However, the fact that young King William was able to reign at all, however briefly, indicates the prestige and power that William I had been able to establish and that young King William had managed to at least partially retain.
