= Subu people =

Cameroonian ethnic group

Suwu (Isubu)
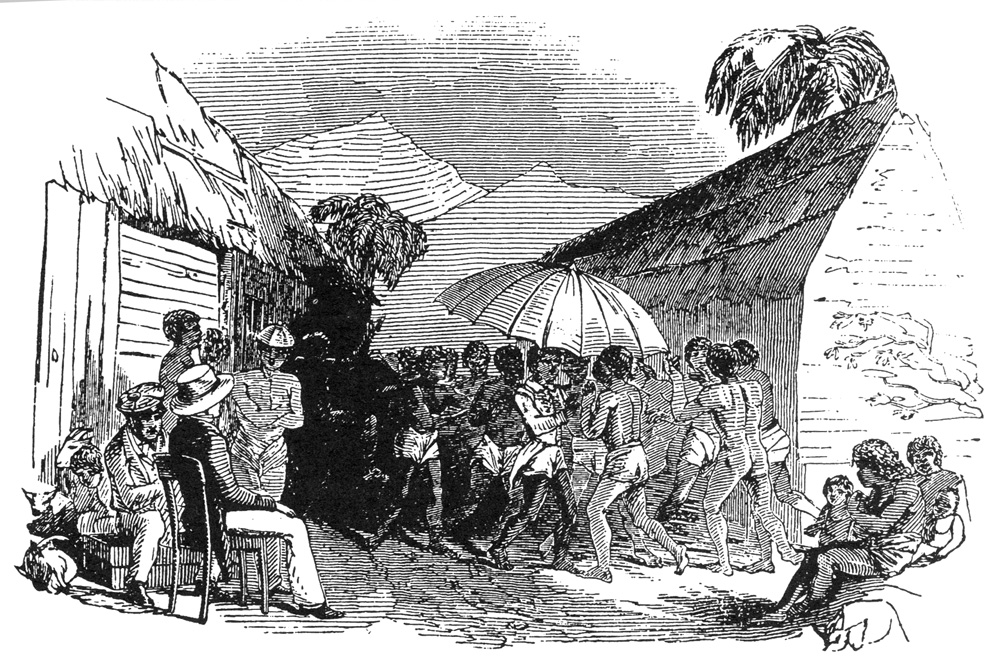
- Joseph Merrick at an Isubu funeral in Cameroon, 1845.

Total population
- 800 (1982)

Regions with significant populations
- Cameroon

Languages
- Suwu, Duala, Malimba, Mokpwe, Wumboko

Religion
- Predominantly Christianity, African Traditional Religion

Related ethnic groups
- Bakole, Bakweri, Bamboko, Duala, Limba, Mungo, Wovea

The Subu (Isubu, Isuwu, Bimbians) are a Bantu ethnic group who inhabit part of the coast of Cameroon. Along with other coastal peoples, they belong to Cameroon's Sawa ethnic groups. They were one of the earliest Cameroonian peoples to make contact with Europeans, and over two centuries, they became influential traders and middlemen. Under the kings William I of Bimbia and Young King William, the Isubu formed a state called Bimbia.

== History ==
=== Early population movements ===
The predominant Isubu oral history holds that the ethnic group hails from Mboko, the area southwest of Mount Cameroon. Tradition makes them the descendants of Isuwu na Monanga, who led their migration to the west bank of the Wouri estuary. When a descendant of Isuwu named Mbimbi became king, the people began to refer to their territories as Bimbia.

=== Kingdom of Bimbia ===
Portuguese traders reached the Wouri estuary in 1472. Over the next few decades, more Europeans came to explore the estuary and the rivers that feed it, and to establish trading posts. The Isubu carved out a role for themselves as middlemen, trading ivory, kola nuts, and peppers from the interior. However, a major commodity was slaves, most bound for plantations on nearby islands such as Annobón, Fernando Po, Príncipe, and São Tomé. By the 16th century, the Isubu were second only to the Duala in trade. The earliest Isubu merchants were likely chiefs or headmen. Bimbia, the primary Isubu settlement, grew quickly.

European traders did their best to support friendly chiefs against their rivals, adulating them with titles such as King, Prince, or Chief. An Isubu chief named Bile became leader of the Isubu as King William, although Dick Merchant of Dikolo village and other chiefs eventually opposed his dominance.

British traders became the dominant European presence in the region by the mid-19th century, and the Crown used them to enforce abolition of the slave trade in the Gulf of Guinea. In 1844 and 1848, King William signed anti-slavery treaties. In exchange, the traders provided him with annual gifts of alcohol, guns, textiles, and other goods. William was also asked to forbid practices the British viewed as barbaric, such as sacrificing a chief's wife upon his death. With William's blessing, Bimbia became a haven for repatriated slaves and escapees from the illicit trade, which continued for many more years.

The British also endeavored to educate and Christianise the Bimbians. King William rebuffed the earliest missionaries because he did not agree with their insistence on prayer and opposition to polygamy. In 1844, however, Joseph Merrick convinced William to let him open a church and school in Bimbia. In 1858, the Spanish ousted Protestant missionaries from their base at Fernando Po. King William sold a portion of his domains to the missionary Alfred Saker, who then founded Victoria (today known as Limbe). By 1875, numerous missions and schools sprung up in Victoria and other settlements. Victoria came to be a mixture of freed slaves, working Cameroonians, and Christianised Cameroonians from the various coastal groups. Cameroonian Pidgin English began to develop at this time.

Isubu society was changed fundamentally by the European trade. European goods became status symbols, and some rulers appointed Western traders and missionaries as advisors. Large numbers of Isubu grew wealthy, leading to rising class tensions. Competition escalated between coastal groups and even between related settlements. Between 1855 and 1879, the Isubu alone engaged in at least four conflicts, both internal and with rival ethnic groups. Traders exploited this atmosphere, and beginning in 1860, German, French, and Spanish merchants had established contacts and weakened the British monopoly. The Duala had gained a virtual hegemony over trade through the Wouri estuary, and the Isubu had little power left. Young King William was virtually powerless when he succeeded his father in 1878.

=== German administration ===
In July 1884, the Isubu found themselves part of the German Empire after annexation by Gustav Nachtigal. Coastal territory became the heart of the new colony, but Bimbia and the Isubu lands had already passed their prime.

German arrival on the mainland meant that the coastal peoples' monopoly on trade had ended. Years of contact with Westerners and a high level of literacy had allowed a literate upper class of Isubu clerks, farmers, and traders to emerge in Victoria and Buea. This class was familiar with European law and conventions, which allowed them to pressure the German colonial government with petitions, legal proceedings, and special interest groups to oppose unpopular or unfair policies.

=== British administration ===
In 1918, Germany lost World War I, and her colonies became mandates of the League of Nations. The British became the new colonial rulers of Isubu lands. Great Britain integrated its portion of Cameroon with the neighbouring colony of Nigeria, setting the new province's capital at Buea. The British practiced a policy of indirect rule, entrusting greater powers to Bakweri and Isubu chiefs in Buea and Victoria. Chief Manga Williams of Victoria became one of two representatives to the Nigerian Eastern House of Assembly. He was succeeded by another Isubu, John Manga Williams.

== Geography ==
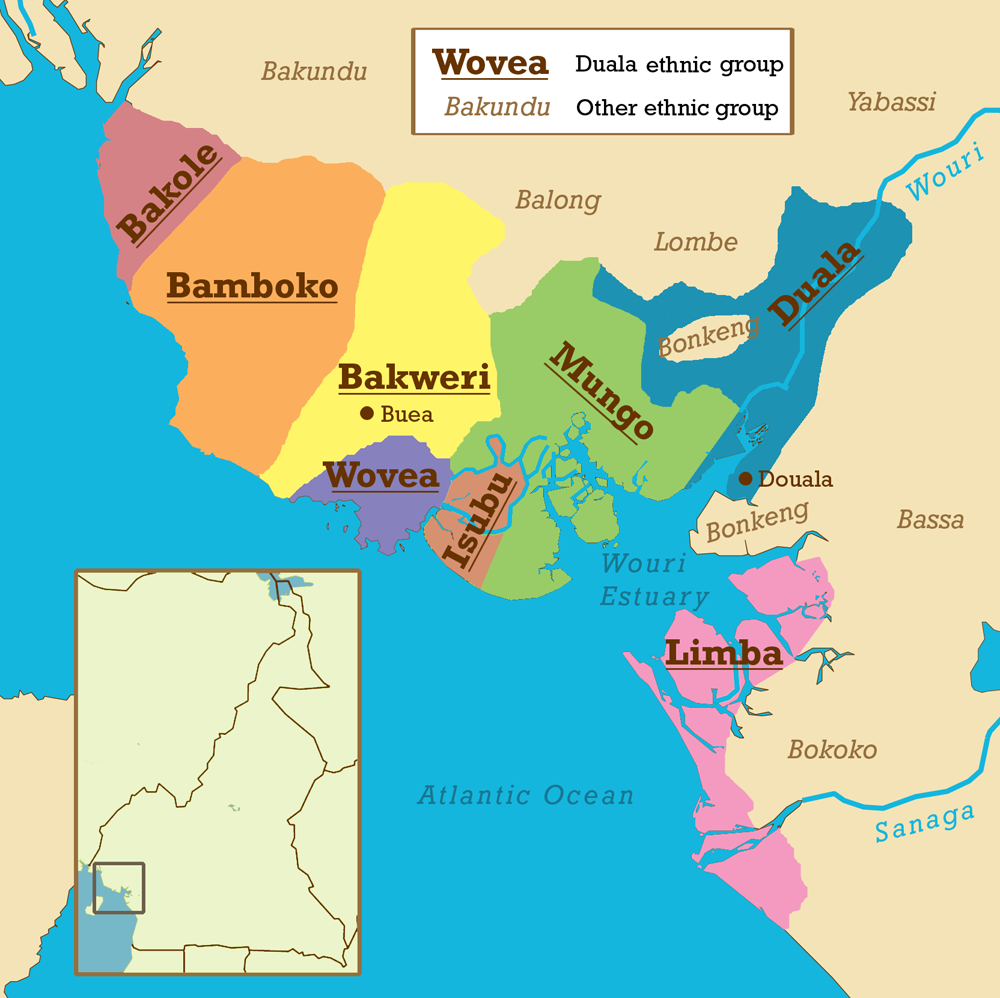
Map showing the location of the various Duala ethnic groups of Cameroon

The Isubu are primarily concentrated in the Fako division of Cameroon's Southwest Province. Their settlements lie largely along the coast or just inland, east of Limbe and west of Douala. They occupy the coast directly east of the Wovea, with their main settlement at Bimbia. The town of Limbe is a mixture of Isubu and other ethnic groups.

== Culture ==
The Isubu today are divided into the urban and rural. Those who live in the cities earn a living at a number of skilled and unskilled professions. The rural Isubu work as fishermen and farmers, mostly at the subsistence level.

=== Language ===
Isu is the Isubu language. In addition, many Isubu speak Duala or Mokpwe, the languages of the Duala and Bakweri respectively. Isu is part of the Bantu group of the Niger–Congo language family.

In addition, individuals who have attended school or lived in an urban centre usually speak a European language. For some Isubu, this is French; for others, it is Cameroonian Pidgin English or standard English. A growing number of the Anglophones today grow up with Pidgin as their first tongue.

=== Religion ===
The Isubu have been mostly Christianized since the 1930s. Evangelical denominations dominate, particularly the Baptist church. Nevertheless, remnants of a pre-Christian ancestor worship persist.

=== Arts ===
The Isubu participate in the annual Ngondo, a traditional festival of the Duala, although today all of Cameroon's coastal peoples are invited. The main focus is on communicating with the ancestors and asking them for guidance and protection for the future. The festivities also include armed combat, beauty pageants, pirogue races, and traditional wrestling.

== Classification ==
The Isubu are Bantu in language and origin. More narrowly, they fall into the Sawa, or the coastal peoples of Cameroon.
