= Kwane a Ngie =

18th-century Duala ruler

- Ruler of the Duala
- Reign: 1788-1790
- Successor: Ewonde a Kwane
- Dynasty: Bonambela sublineage

Kwane a Ngie, known in British records as Angua or Quan, was a Duala ruler from the Bonambela sublineage who flourished from 1788 to 1790 in Douala, Cameroon. The British slave trade was at its height at this time, and, although a rival ruler from the Bonanjo sublineage named George or Joss reigned simultaneously, British records point to Kwane as the more powerful or respected leader.

According to British court records from 1788, when a British trader kidnapped several Duala and threatened to sell them in the West Indies, "Quan" was the more aggressive ruler in trying to secure their return by pressuring other British captains. The records of the British ship Sarah in 1790 indicate that while George received custom from traders, "Angua" got a bigger "dash" (bonus gift) and sold 50 slaves to George's 40. This rivalry with George is the earliest indication that the Duala people were fragmenting into rival Akwa and Bell lineages. Angua was succeeded by his son, Ewonde a Kwane.
