= Bimbia =

Former independent state of Isubu people of Cameroon

Bimbia Bimbia
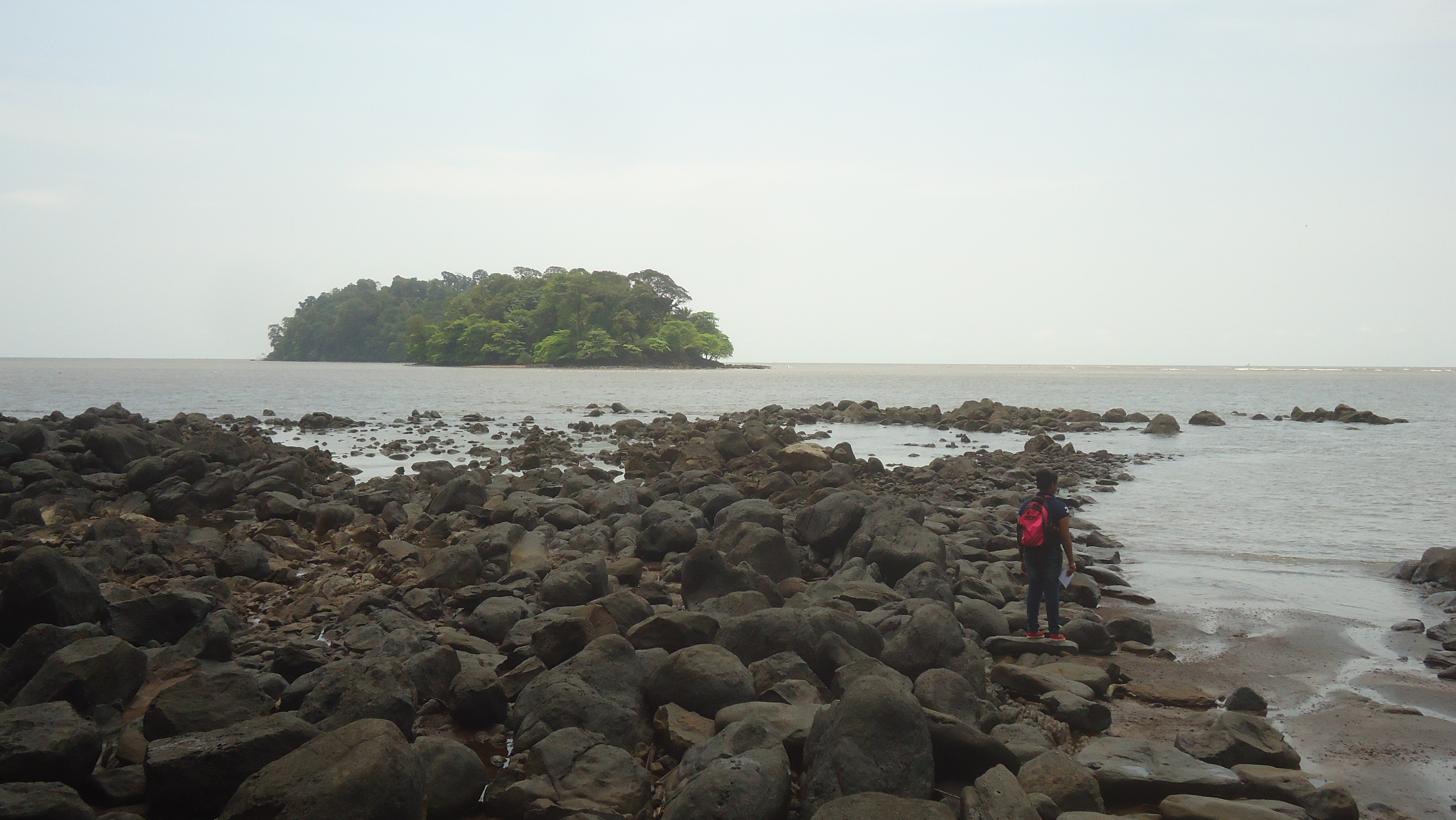
- Nicole Island

- Location in Cameroon
- Coordinates: 4°01′N 9°13′E
- Country: Cameroon
- region: South-West
- Divisions: Fako
- Climate: Am

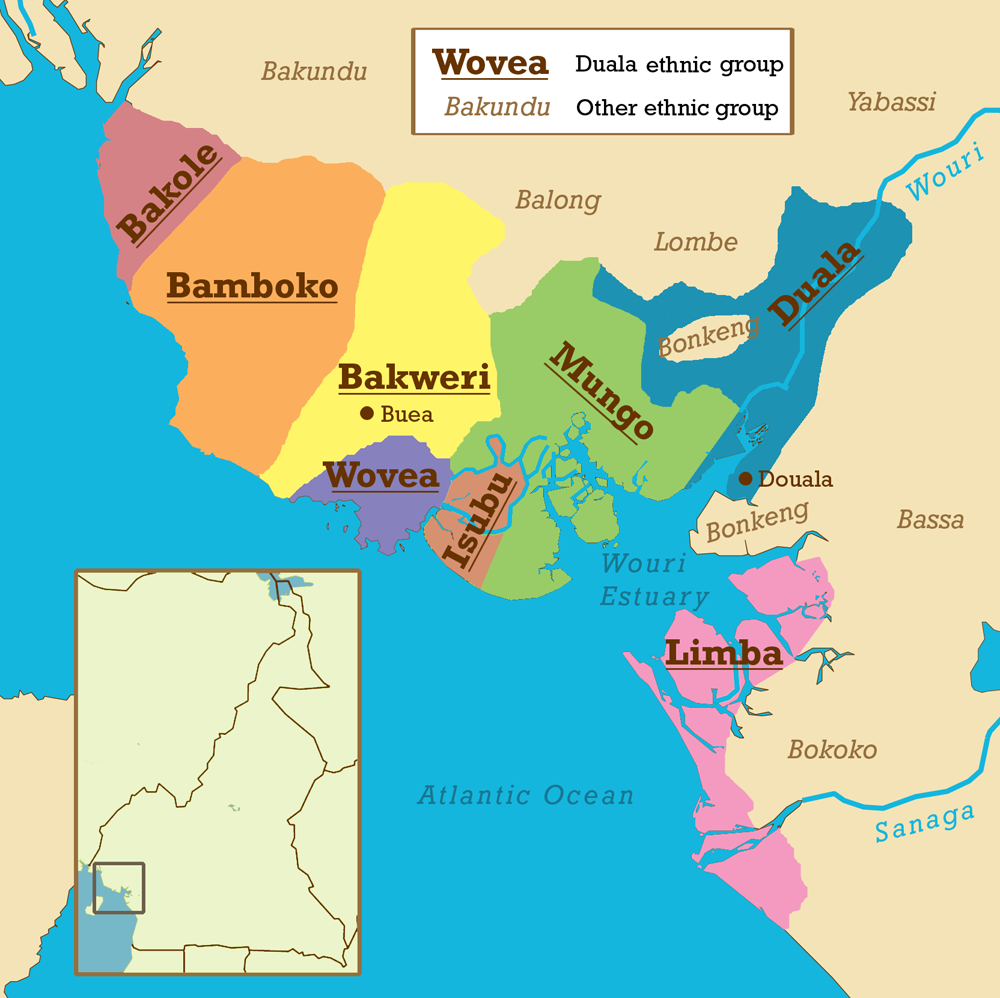
Map showing the location of the various ethnic groups of coastal Cameroon. Bimbia was the kingdom of the Isubu people

Bimbia was an independent state of the Isubu people of Cameroon. In 1884, it was annexed by the German Empire and incorporated in the colony of Kamerun. It lies in Southwest Region, to the south of Mount Cameroon and to the west of the Wouri estuary. It is situated at the East coast of the Limbé sub-division.

Bimbia consists of three villages:

- Dikolo
- Bona Ngombe
- Bona Bille

In 1932, the population of Bimbia was about 2500 people.

== History ==
=== Origins ===
The predominant Isubu oral history holds that the ethnic group hails from Mboko, the area southwest of Mount Cameroon. Tradition makes them the descendants of Isuwu na Monanga, who led their migration to the west bank of the Wouri estuary. When a descendant of Isuwu named Mbimbi became king, the people began to refer to their territories as Bimbia.

=== Early European contacts ===
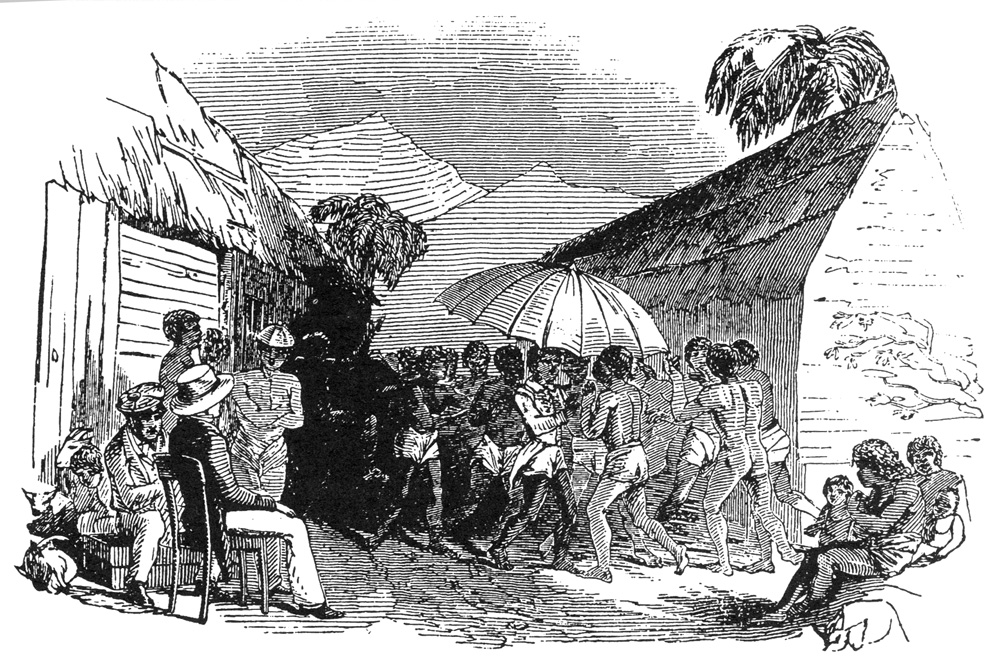
Joseph Merrick at an Isubu funeral in Cameroon, 1845.

Portuguese traders reached the Wouri estuary in 1472. Over the next few decades, more Europeans came to explore the estuary and the rivers that feed it, and to establish trading posts. The Isubu carved out a role for themselves as middlemen, trading ivory, kola nuts, and peppers from the interior. However, a major commodity was slaves, most bound for plantations on nearby islands such as Annobón, Fernando Po, Príncipe, and São Tomé.

By the 16th century, the Isubu were second only to the Duala in trade. The earliest Isubu merchants were likely tribal chiefs or headmen. Bimbia, the primary Isubu settlement, grew quickly.

=== British influence ===
British traders became the dominant European presence in the region by the mid-19th century, and the Crown used them to enforce abolition of the slave trade in the Gulf of Guinea. In 1844 and 1848, King William signed anti-slavery treaties. In exchange, the traders provided him with annual gifts of alcohol, guns, textiles, and other goods. William was also asked to forbid practices the British viewed as barbaric, such as sacrificing a chief's wife upon his death. With William's blessing, Bimbia became a haven for repatriated slaves and escapees from the illicit trade, which continued for many more years.

The British also endeavored to educate and Christianise the Bimbians. King William rebuffed the earliest missionaries because he did not agree with their insistence on prayer and opposition to polygamy. In 1844, however, Joseph Merrick convinced William to let him open a church and school in Bimbia. In 1858, the Spanish ousted Protestant missionaries from their base at Fernando Po. King William sold a portion of his domains to the missionary Alfred Saker, who then founded Victoria (today known as Limbe). By 1875, numerous missions and schools sprung up in Victoria and other settlements. Victoria came to be a mixture of freed slaves, working Cameroonians, and Christianised Cameroonians from the various coastal groups. Cameroonian Pidgin English began to develop at this time.

Isubu society was changed fundamentally by the European trade. European goods became status symbols, and some rulers appointed Western traders and missionaries as advisors. Large numbers of Isubu grew wealthy, leading to rising class tensions. Competition escalated between coastal groups and even between related settlements. Between 1855 and 1879, the Isubu alone engaged in at least four conflicts, both internal and with rival ethnic groups. Traders exploited this atmosphere, and beginning in 1860, German, French, and Spanish merchants had established contacts and weakened the British monopoly. The Duala had gained a virtual hegemony over trade through the Wouri estuary, and the Isubu had little power left. Young King William was virtually powerless when he succeeded his father in 1878.

=== Treaties ===
On 17 February 1844, King William I of Bimbia and the chiefs of Bimbia concluded a treaty with Lieutenant Edward Charles Earl, commander of the English brig Rapid in which the slave trade was prohibited in exchange for goods worth $1,200, and free trade was guaranteed. On 19 December 1850, a further treaty with Thomas Rodney Eden, captain of the Amphitrite, regulated trade terms, covering subjects such as payment of "comey", a customary fee paid by trading vessels to chiefs in exchange for permission to trade. On 7 February 1855, the British Acting Consul, J.W.B. Lynslager, witnessed an engagement in which the chiefs of the Boobee (Bubi) Islands, adjacent to the Amboise (Ambas) Islands, settled the recent dispute and acknowledged King William of Bimbia's authority.

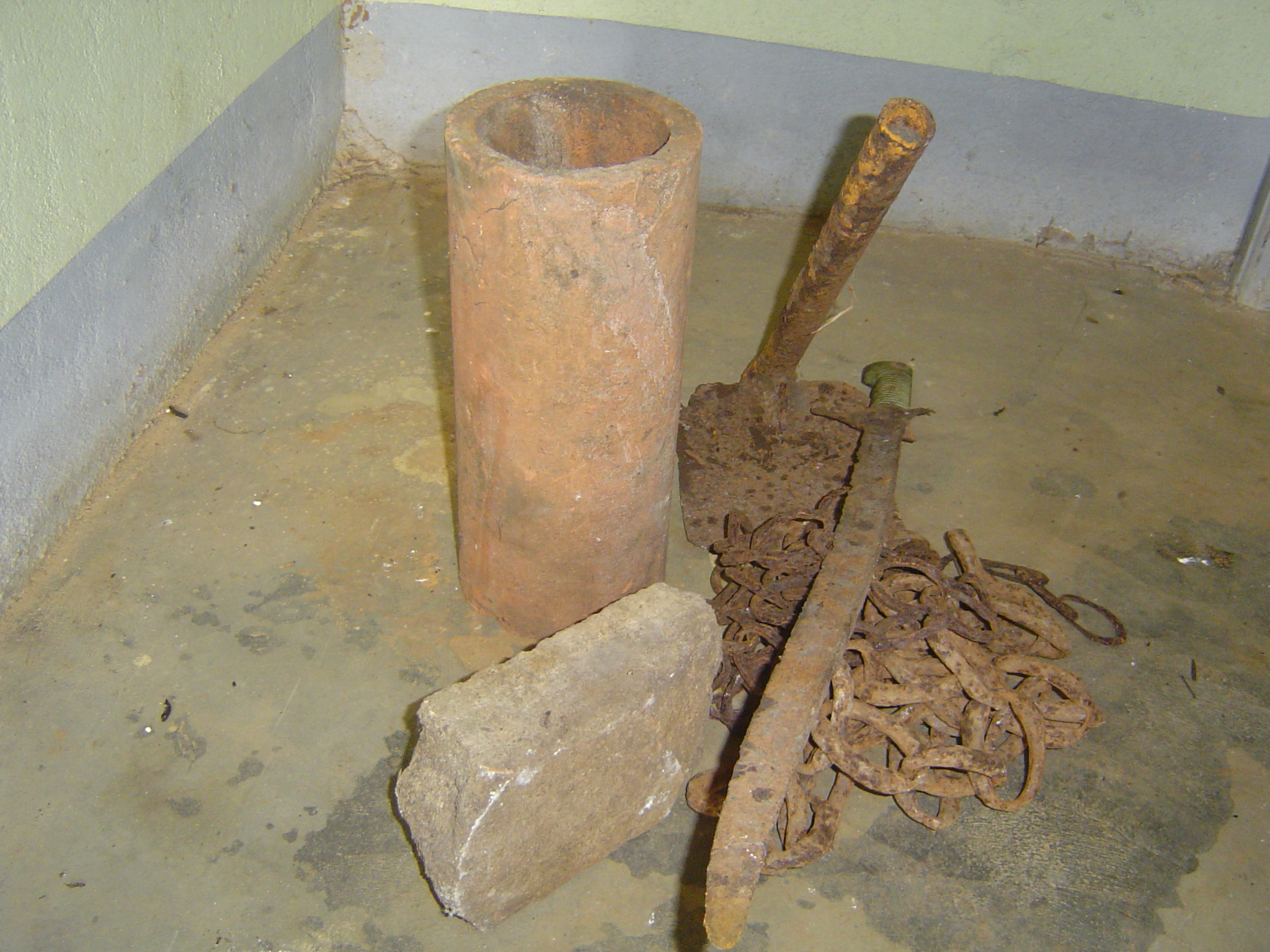
Slavery Artifacts

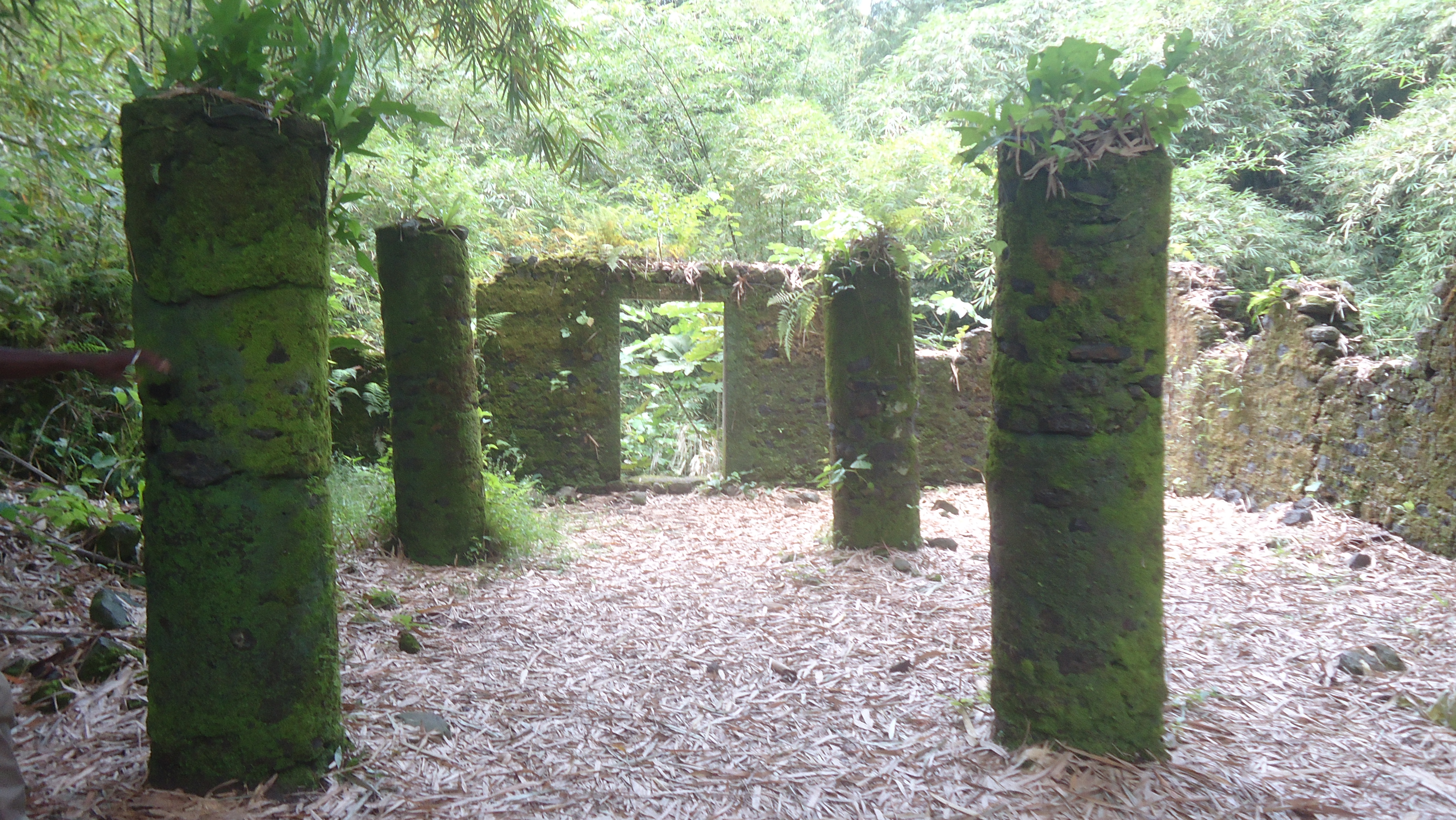
Prison for recalcitrant slaves

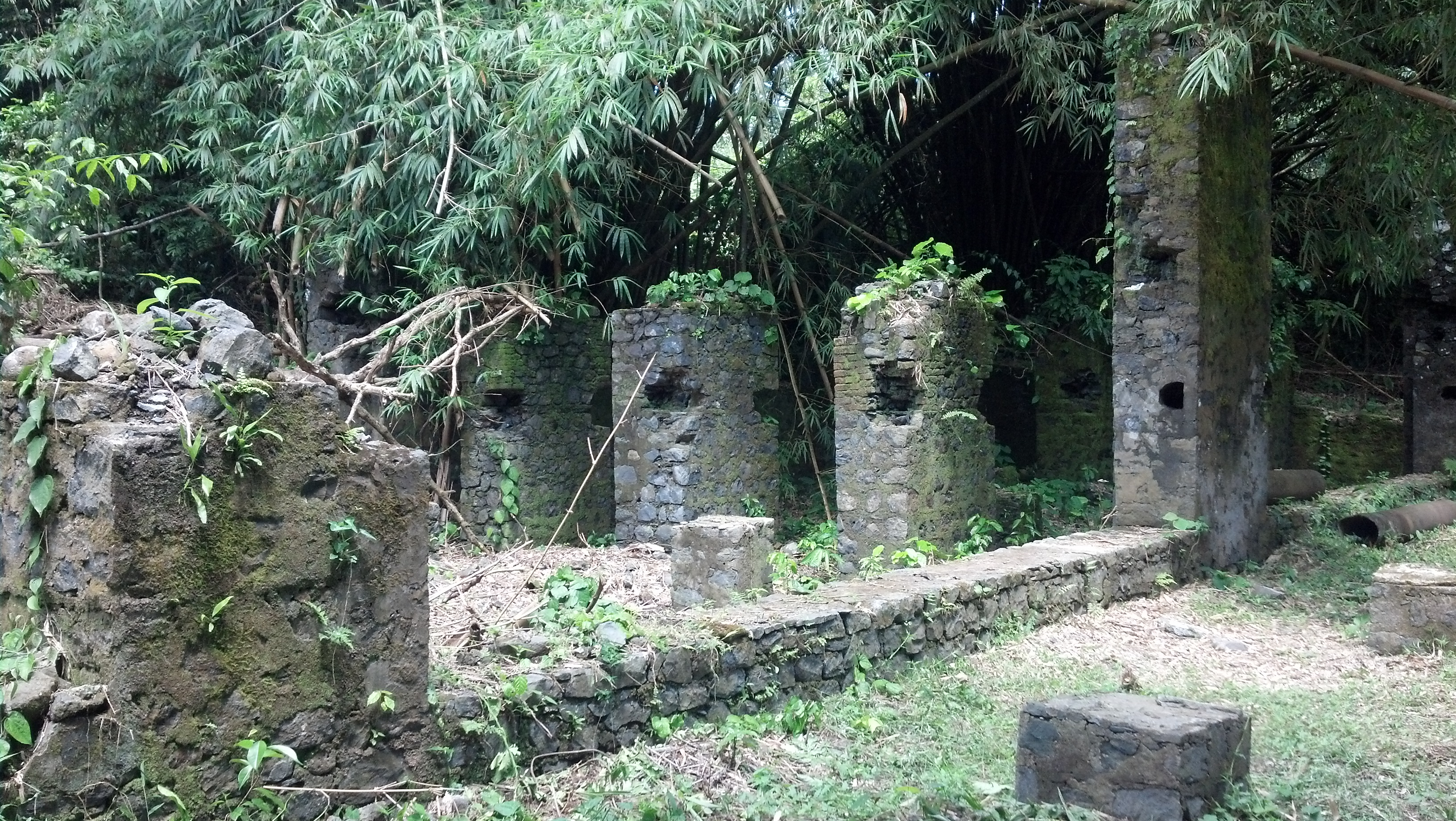
Bimbia Slave Port

=== German protectorate ===
A German protectorate over the Cameroons was declared on 12 July 1884. In a communication of 15 October 1884 the German Government described the territories included in the protectorate, which included Bimbia.

== Economic activities ==
=== Fishing and Farming ===
The Bimbia are mostly fishermen. In the thirties, the fishing industry was flourishing. Fishing is a communal labour as it was not possible for one man to be able to set up his fishing equipment. Therefore, the men of the village came together and made the equipment of one person then went to the other.

=== Technics ===
The Bimbia man fishes in many different ways namely: Ndemba, Ngoto, Mbunja, Efese and Moleke.

The women are yam planters. People come to buy benyanya, smoked njanga, smoked mwanjamoto and other fish. Women come from chop farm with raw food to exchange for fish and bring things like accra banana, groundnuts and koki beans.

The women dry all the fish, sell it or barter for household needs. During the dry season, the men go to sea in the night. The women work until morning on the efefe to sort out the fish in their different species, put on very big baskets called ‘ndenge’ and start drying them on the ‘wokas’. Woka is a stake made of bamboos from the palm tree. Then carry the wokas to the ‘etaka’ or bandas where a long fire is made to smoke the fish at night. The dried benyanya is stored away to give way for other fish to be dried also. When the season for meyo is over, the season for mwanjamoto and crayfish (njanga) starts.

Women are, from the sale of fish, responsible for looking after of all the house needs such as soap, oil, salt, kerosene etc. Men are responsible for the sale of the big benyanya to pay school fees.

== Chiefs ==
Dikolo has six quarters : Mbeng’a Liwoka, Bali, Wona Wonanya, Wona Ngowe, Wona Mbimbi and Mabetefutu with their family heads and a traditional chief.

Bimbia chieftaincy stool does not rotate. It is in the same family for all generations.

- In Dikolo the Ekum’a Makundu family have the chieftaincy and it is not contested for.
- In Bona Ngombe the Musuka family have the chieftaincy.
- In Bona Bille the Billa Lozenge family have the chieftaincy, the descendants of king William of Bimbia.
