= Suwu language =

Bantu language spoken in Cameroon

Suwu
- Subu
- Isuwu, Isubu
- Native to: Cameroon
- Region: Fako
- Ethnicity: Subu
- Native speakers: (800 cited 1982) "few" speakers (2007)
- Language family: Niger–Congo?: Atlantic–Congo; Benue–Congo; Bantoid; Bantu (Zone A); Sawabantu (A.20); Suwu

Language codes
- ISO 639-3: szv
- Glottolog: isuf1235
- Guthrie code: A.23
- ELP: Isubu

Suwu (Su), or Subu (also Isuwu, Isu, Isubu), also known as Bimbia, is a Bantu language of Cameroon.
