= William I of Bimbia =

King William I and II of the Isubu

William I of Bimbia, born Bile, was born in 1800 and lived until 1877. He was chief and king of the Isubu ethnic group, who lived in Bimbia on the coast of Cameroon in the mid-to-late 19th century. British traders recognised William's sovereignty over Bimbia and titled him "king". William sold land to the British missionary Alfred Saker to found the Baptist colony of Victoria, now Limbe. This act puzzled rival Bakweri chiefs, since William did not actually own the territory. William I of Bimbia died at age 77.

William was succeeded by Young King William, his son.
