= Duala language =

Bantu language spoken by the Duala and Mungo peoples of Cameroon

Duala
- Duálá
- Native to: Cameroon
- Ethnicity: Duala, Mungo, Wovea
- Native speakers: (87,700 cited 1982); Most speakers live in Douala, the biggest city of Cameroon, which has since grown more than four times as big.
- Language family: Niger–Congo?: Atlantic–Congo; Volta-Congo; Benue–Congo; Bantoid; Southern Bantoid; Bantu; Zone A; Sawabantu; Duala–Limba; Duala
- Dialects: Duala proper; Bodiman; Oli (Ewodi, Wuri); Pongo; Mongo (Muungo)

Language codes
- ISO 639-2: dua
- ISO 639-3: Either: dua – Duala olb – Oli-Bodiman
- Glottolog: dual1243 Duala olib1234 Oli-Bidiman
- Guthrie code: A.24–26

Jo
- Native to: Cameroon
- Region: around Douala
- Native speakers: None
- Language family: Douala-based pidgin

Language codes
- ISO 639-3: None (mis)
- Glottolog: None
- Guthrie code: A.20A

Duala (native name: Duálá) is a dialect cluster spoken by the Duala and Mungo peoples of Cameroon. Duala belongs to the Bantu language family, in a subgroup called Sawabantu. It is a tonal language with subject–verb–object word order. Maho (2009) treats Duala as a cluster of five languages: Duala proper, Bodiman, Oli (Ewodi, Wuri), Pongo and Mongo. He also notes a Duala-based pidgin named Jo.

== History ==
The origins of Duala come from the migrations of the Duala people during the sixteenth century from the Congo River Basin to the coastal areas of southern Cameroon. While it is a Bantu language, Guthrie estimates that it has only retained as little as 14% of the roots of Proto-Bantu.

Alfred Saker, a British missionary and linguist, completed the first translation of the Bible into Duala in 1870. After the German colonization of Cameroon in 1885, the Basel Mission promoted Duala as a lingua franca in southern Cameroon with support from the German authorities. In particular, Julius von Soden, the Governor of Cameroon in the 1880s, supported Duala as a recognized lingua franca in the colony, although he maintained that German should be the language of instruction in schools for brighter pupils. In 1903, the Basel missionaries launched a monthly journal titled Mulée Ngéa.

The missionaries' focus on using Duala in areas that did not natively speak it was viewed as dangerous by colonial officials, as they feared the practice would lead to ethnic conflict by elevating Duala to a prestige language. Since Duala was also being used by the missionaries in their schools, it was difficult for Cameroonians to become educated and obtain business, teaching, or government positions without knowledge of the language. This reinforced German officials' fears of the Duala ethnic group gaining too much power. Therefore, upon becoming Governor of Cameroon, Jesko von Puttkamer decided to suppress Duala and other local languages, such as Ewe in Togoland, and promote German in the colony instead. Puttkamer blamed the Protestant missionaries for the lack of German-language use in Cameroon, and pressured them to stop using Duala in their schools and official communications. In 1897, he began pressuring them to switch to German, and later praised the Catholic missionaries in the territory for using German.

In 1910, Governor Theodor Seitz issued an ordinance establishing governmental control over all educational establishments in the colony, including those run by missionaries. The ordinance enforced the use of German in schools and forbade the use of all other European languages. It also limited the use of Duala by missionaries to the traditional lands of the Duala people in order to prevent the spread of the language, as the German government wanted to prevent communication between local groups in the case of a revolution.

After World War I, eastern Cameroon was mandated by the League of Nations to France and western Cameroon was mandated to the United Kingdom. The French government ordered that only French could be used in schools in 1920. The British allowed the use of Duala by missionaries and schools, but English-medium schools became the norm due to the colonial governmental influence and the lack of written materials in Duala. By the 1950s, this meant that Cameroonians were using English as an instructional language and Duala as a "church" language, even if Duala was not their mother tongue. Through the 1960s and 1970s, as Cameroon gained independence, Duala remained in use only in religious and informal contexts, as the missionaries continued to use it and develop Duala texts for religious use.

== Usage ==
University programs in the cities of Yaoundé and Douala, as well as many local lycées, offer classes in Duala and other local languages. Duala is also used on an unofficial ad hoc basis in other schools as a medium of primary instruction to facilitate understanding. The television channel Dan Broadcasting System airs programs in Duala. However, it has been observed that attempts to introduce Duala and other local languages into schools have received some resistance from locals, as they do not view it as helpful for socio-economic development.

=== Popular culture ===
The song Soul Makossa, as well as pop songs that repeated its lyrics, internationally popularized the Duala word for "(I) dance", "makossa". The song Alane by artist Wes Madiko is sung in Duala and reached the #1 chart position in at least 10 European countries.

== Phonology ==
=== Consonants ===
		Labial	Alveolar	Palatal	Velar	Glottal
Nasal		m	n	ɲ	ŋ	
Plosive/ Affricate	voiceless	p	t	t͡ʃ	k	
Plosive/ Affricate	voiced	b	d	d͡ʒ		
Plosive/ Affricate	prenasal vl.	ᵐp	ⁿt		ᵑk	
Plosive/ Affricate	prenasal vd.	ᵐb	ⁿd	ⁿd͡ʒ	ᵑɡ	
Fricative		f	s			h
Approximant		w	l	j		

Sounds /b, d, ᵐb, ⁿd/ are heard as implosives [ɓ, ɗ], [ᵐɓ, ⁿɗ] when before close vowels /i, u/.

[r] is heard as a variant of /l/ in loanwords.

=== Vowels ===
	Front	Central	Back
Close	i		u
Close-mid	e		o
Open-mid	ɛ		ɔ
Open		a	

== Alphabet ==
Uppercase	A	B	Ɓ	C	D	Ɗ	E	Ɛ	F	G	H	I	J	K	L	M	N	Ŋ	Ɲ	O	Ɔ	P	Q	R	S	T	U	V	W	X	Y	Z
Lowercase	a	b	ɓ	c	d	ɗ	e	ɛ	f	g	h	i	j	k	l	m	n	ŋ	ɲ	o	ɔ	p	q	r	s	t	u	v	w	x	y	z

== Bibliography ==
1. E. Dinkelacker, Wörterbuch der Duala-Sprache, Hamburg, 1914. [Duala - German dictionary]
2. Paul Helmlinger, Dictionnaire duala-français, suivi d'un lexique français-duala. Editions Klincksieck, Paris, 1972. [Duala - French dictionary]
3. Johannes Ittmann, edited by Emmi Kähler-Meyer, Wörterbuch der Duala-Sprache, Dictionnaire de la langue duala, Dictionary of the Duala Language, Dietrich Reimer, Berlin, 1976. [Duala - German - French - English dictionary. The preface evaluates ref. 1 above as terse, but good, while ref. 2 has missing and erroneous tone marks.]
4. Johannes Ittmann, Grammatik des Duala (Kamerun), Verlag Dietrich Reimer, Berlin, 1939. [A grammar of Duala.]
