= Busher (name) =

Busher is a surname. Notable people with the surname include:

- Harold Busher (1876–1954), English cricketer
- Jerry Busher, American drummer
- Leonard Busher (fl. 1614), seventeenth-century English religious writer
- Sydney Busher (1882–1953), English cricketer
- Nathan Busher (2003-), frontman of English Pop-Punk band IVYSIRENS

== See also ==
- Bushe
