= Baptists in the history of separation of church and state =

Separation of church and state is one of the primary theological distinctions of the Baptist tradition.

== History ==
Originally, Baptists supported separation of church and state in England and America. Some important Baptist figures in the struggle were John Smyth, Thomas Helwys, Edward Wightman, Leonard Busher, Roger Williams (who was a Baptist for a short period but became a "Seeker"), John Clarke, Isaac Backus, and John Leland.

=== English Baptists ===
In 1612 John Smyth wrote, "the magistrate is not by virtue of his office to meddle with religion, or matters of conscience". That same year, Thomas Helwys wrote that the King of England could "command what of man he will, and we are to obey it," but, concerning the church—"with this Kingdom, our lord the King hath nothing to do." In 1614, Leonard Busher wrote what is believed to be the earliest Baptist treatise dealing exclusively with the subject of religious liberty.

=== American Baptists ===
The Danbury Baptist Association of Danbury, Connecticut sent a letter, dated October 7, 1801, to the newly elected President Thomas Jefferson, expressing concern over the lack in their state constitution of explicit protection of religious liberty, and against a government establishment of religion.

In their letter to the President, the Danbury Baptists affirmed that "Our Sentiments are uniformly on the side of Religious Liberty":

The address of the Danbury Baptist Association in the State of Connecticut, assembled October 7, 1801.

To Thomas Jefferson, Esq., President of the United States of America

Sir, Among the many millions in America and Europe who rejoice in your election to office, we embrace the first opportunity which we have enjoyed in our collective capacity, since your inauguration, to express our great satisfaction in your appointment to the Chief Magistracy in the United States. And though the mode of expression may be less courtly and pompous than what many others clothe their addresses with, we beg you, sir, to believe, that none is more sincere.

Our sentiments are uniformly on the side of religious liberty: that Religion is at all times and places a matter between God and individuals, that no man ought to suffer in name, person, or effects on account of his religious opinions, [and] that the legitimate power of civil government extends no further than to punish the man who works ill to his neighbor. But sir, our constitution of government is not specific. Our ancient charter, together with the laws made coincident therewith, were adapted as the basis of our government at the time of our revolution. And such has been our laws and usages, and such still are, [so] that Religion is considered as the first object of Legislation, and therefore what religious privileges we enjoy (as a minor part of the State) we enjoy as favors granted, and not as inalienable rights. And these favors we receive at the expense of such degrading acknowledgments, as are inconsistent with the rights of freemen. It is not to be wondered at therefore, if those who seek after power and gain, under the pretense of government and Religion, should reproach their fellow men, [or] should reproach their Chief Magistrate, as an enemy of religion, law, and good order, because he will not, dares not, assume the prerogative of Jehovah and make laws to govern the Kingdom of Christ.

Sir, we are sensible that the President of the United States is not the National Legislator and also sensible that the national government cannot destroy the laws of each State, but our hopes are strong that the sentiment of our beloved President, which have had such genial effect already, like the radiant beams of the sun, will shine and prevail through all these States—and all the world—until hierarchy and tyranny be destroyed from the earth. Sir, when we reflect on your past services, and see a glow of philanthropy and goodwill shining forth in a course of more than thirty years, we have reason to believe that America's God has raised you up to fill the Chair of State out of that goodwill which he bears to the millions which you preside over. May God strengthen you for the arduous task which providence and the voice of the people have called you—to sustain and support you and your Administration against all the predetermined opposition of those who wish to rise to wealth and importance on the poverty and subjection of the people.

And may the Lord preserve you safe from every evil and bring you at last to his Heavenly Kingdom through Jesus Christ our Glorious Mediator.

Signed in behalf of the Association,

Neh'h Dodge

Eph'm Robbins The Committee

Stephen S. Nelson

As a religious minority in Connecticut, the Danbury Baptists were concerned that a religious majority might "reproach their chief Magistrate... because he will not, dare not assume the prerogatives of Jehovah and make Laws to govern the Kingdom of Christ," thus establishing a state religion at the cost of the liberties of religious minorities.

==== "Make no law" ====
Thomas Jefferson's response, dated January 1, 1802, concurs with the Danbury Baptists' views on religious liberty, and the accompanying separation of civil government from concerns of religious doctrine and practice.

Messrs. Nehemiah Dodge, Ephraim Robbins, and Stephen S. Nelson

A Committee of the Danbury Baptist Association, in the State of Connecticut.

Washington, January 1, 1802

Gentlemen, – The affectionate sentiment of esteem and approbation which you are so good as to express towards me, on behalf of the Danbury Baptist Association, give me the highest satisfaction. My duties dictate a faithful and zealous pursuit of the interests of my constituents, and in proportion as they are persuaded of my fidelity to those duties, the discharge of them becomes more and more pleasing.

Believing with you that religion is a matter which lies solely between man and his God, that he owes account to none other for his faith or his worship, that the legislative powers of government reach actions only, and not opinions, I contemplate with sovereign reverence that act of the whole American people which declared that their legislature would "make no law respecting an establishment of religion, or prohibiting the free exercise thereof," thus building a wall of separation between Church and State. Adhering to this expression of the supreme will of the nation in behalf of the rights of conscience, I shall see with sincere satisfaction the progress of those sentiments which tend to restore to man all his natural rights, convinced he has no natural right in opposition to his social duties.

I reciprocate your kind prayers for the protection and blessing of the common Father and Creator of man, and tender you for yourselves and your religious association, assurances of my high respect and esteem.

Th Jefferson Jan. 1. 1802

This doctrine, known as the "wall of separation" or "strict separationism," would later become highly influential in 20th century Supreme Court understandings of the relationship between church and state. The phrase "separation of church and state" does not appear in the United States Constitution, despite its wide use and origin from a founding father. The relevance of this reply is a subject of heated debate, with scholars such as Robert Boston emphasizing its importance, and others such as Mark David Hall arguing that the letter was a historical outlier.

== Contemporary Baptist views in America ==
In the U.S. today, a group of Baptists believe the United States was formed as a Christian nation by the Founding Fathers. There is neither a unifying nor a codified doctrinal position among American Baptists. Interpretations of the meaning of "separation of church and state" vary among different Baptist affiliations.

However, many Baptists in the United States still believe in the wall of separation and support maintaining it. For example, fifteen Baptist organizations, representing collectively over ten million Baptists in America, collaborate with one another to protect religious liberty and the separation of church and state through their funding of the Baptist Joint Committee for Religious Liberty. Freedom of conscience is a historic Baptist distinctive, and many Baptists continue to believe the best course for obtaining and securing freedom of conscience is through the separation of church and state.

== See also ==
- Baptists
- East Waynesville Baptist Church
- Separation of church and state
- Letter to the Hebrew Congregation in Newport
- Soul competency
