= Busher =

Busher may refer to:

== People ==
- Busher (name), people with the surname
- nickname of Floyd Curry (1925–2006), Canadian National Hockey League player
- nickname of Busher Jackson (1911–1966), Canadian Hall of Fame National Hockey League player

== Other uses ==
- Busher Stakes, an American Thoroughbred stakes horse race at Aqueduct Racetrack in Jamaica, New York
- Busher (horse) (1942–1955), a Thoroughbred racing filly
- The Busher, a 1919 drama film

== See also ==
- Bushehr province, Iran
