= East Waynesville Baptist Church =

Church in North Carolina, United States

Coordinates: 35.50019°N 82.97218°W

East Waynesville Baptist Church is a Baptist church in Waynesville, a small town in the Great Smoky Mountains of Western North Carolina, United States of America. It is an independent and autonomous member of the Southern Baptist Convention and the Baptist State Convention of North Carolina (BSCNC). As of May 2005 it had 100 members. The church was involved in a 2005 controversy after the pastor allegedly expelled members because of their political views.

== History ==
The church was built in 1965.

== Purge of members ==
The church received mass media attention in May 2005. During a May 2 deacons' meeting, its pastor Chan Chandler allegedly told any members who had supported John Kerry in the 2004 United States presidential election to leave. This statement was reportedly captured on audio tape. Nine members of the church, including at least one deacon, left the meeting at that point. Chandler then allegedly declared an impromptu business meeting, and a majority of the 20 church members present voted to expel those who left. Chandler had been vocal in earlier months that he considered voting for the Democratic Party tantamount to supporting homosexuality and abortion. Forty church members threatened to terminate their membership in protest against the actions taken at the meeting.

The BSCNC called the actions attributed to the church leadership "highly irregular" and warned that they could threaten the church's tax-exempt status. Groups campaigning for church-state separation called for the Internal Revenue Service to consider removing the church's tax-exempt status on the grounds that it engaged in political advocacy. A writer in Christianity Today said the negative comments about John Kerry cross a line and could have fomented negative tax action. He noted, however, that the parish suffered from a demographic split. Dubbing it "Chandlergate" he noted that according to the Raleigh News and Observer, 35 Chandler followers left the sanctuary when Chandler resigned.

In speaking to the Baptist Press, Chandler attempted "to clarify whether the nine people were in fact voted out of the church, Chandler said they initially left voluntarily." He also told the Baptist Press: "I don't know how these folks voted," Chandler told Baptist Press. "And I never endorsed any candidate." But he admits he preached about the "unbiblical values" of John Kerry, particularly in regard to abortion and homosexuality. He also claimed to have "mentioned two Republicans' names" as unbiblical examples. He opined that he made "negative endorsements" but "never a positive endorsement" of a candidate.

On May 10, 2005 Chandler resigned as pastor. He denied that the actions at the meeting were politically motivated, but did not give his version of events. (Note: One source claimed the "not politically motivated" statement was a sap to the Internal Revenue Service, lest the tax exempt status of the church be jeopardized.) The BSCNC offered to assist the church in healing the rift between the factions.

At least some of the former parishioners continued to be disgruntled, and contemplated taking further actions, including hiring an attorney.

The dispute focused attention on the limits, if any, on the relationship of sermonizing from the pulpit and the political activities of religious practitioners. An opposing view is that a church, being a voluntary association, has an inherent right to discipline and choose its members incidental to its rights of Freedom of religion and Freedom of association, which should not be interfered with by the state. (Note: Understanding, however, that there was no Action of state involved and no legal interference with this process.)

== See also ==
- Baptists in the history of separation of church and state
