= Brasil para Todos =

Organization

Brasil para Todos (Portuguese for Brazil for Everyone) is a non-profit organization whose goal is the removal of religious symbols from government facilities. According to the organization, keeping such religious symbols violates the separation of church and state as established by the Constitution of Brazil.

== Origins ==
The Brasil para Todos movement officially began on January 17, 2007. Many citizens, including politicians and legal experts, have protested against the display of religious symbols in Brazilian government facilities as early as 1891. In 2005, a legal action by judge Roberto Arriada Lorea, from Porto Alegre, received wider media coverage.

== Actions and reactions ==
The movement suggests sympathizers act by leaving support messages on their website and filing legal complaints at the State and Federal attorney's Office. Such actions have resulted in relevant juridic and media response.

== Support ==
The movement has received support from representatives of many faiths, such as monk Coen, Iyalorisa Sandra M. Epega (president of the Non-Governmental Organization Respeito Brasil Yourubá), Baptist priest Djalma Rosa Torres, Vaishnava Hindu priest Jagannatha Dhama Dasa and Milton R. Medran Moreira, president of the Pan-American Spiritism Confederation.

Many legal experts, including judges and attorneys; artists such as cartoonist Laerte Coutinho; politicians such as city councilwoman Soninha Francine and even religious-oriented NGOs such as Católicas pelo Direito de Decidir have also manifested support for the initiative.

== Critics ==
In an opinion piece for the O Estado de S. Paulo newspaper, journalist Gilberto de Mello Kujawski reasoned that "Brazil is not a secular country. Brazil is, in fact, a majoritary catholic, apostolic, roman country, yes, sir. Secular is the State, not the Brazilian country, nation or society".

In an article of his authorship published in the Jornal do Brasil newspaper, law professor Ives Gandra Martins cited the words "under God's protection", from the Brazilian Constitution's introduction, as possible justification for the argument that the movement's aim is unconstitutional.

== See also ==
- Separation of Church and State
- Secularism
