= Sydney Busher =

English cricketer

Cricket information
- Batting: Right-handed
- Bowling: Right-arm fast-medium

Career statistics
Competition	First-class
Matches	5
Runs scored	84
Batting average	12.00
100s/50s	0/1
Top score	52
Balls bowled	836
Wickets	26
Bowling average	14.61
5 wickets in innings	3
10 wickets in match	0
Best bowling	6/63
Catches/stumpings	2/–
- Source: Cricinfo, 14 April 2023

Sydney Edmund Busher (19 December 1882 – 28 May 1953) was an English cricketer who played five first-class games, one for Surrey and four for Worcestershire. Of his 26 first-class wickets, 22 were bowled and four caught.

Although he had played in a minor match for Gentlemen of Surrey v Gentlemen of Netherlands at The Oval in August 1906, Busher's first-class debut did not come until April 1908, when he represented Surrey against Gentlemen of England cricket team at the same venue. Busher's maiden first-class victim was a highly illustrious one: he bowled the opposition captain W. G. Grace, who was making his final first-class appearance at the age of 59. Busher repeated this feat in the second innings, and finished with match figures of 7–92 as well as making 52 (his only fifty) as Surrey won by an innings.

In August of the same year, Busher made his debut for Worcestershire against Gloucestershire at Bristol, and in the second innings claimed what proved to be his career best figures of 6-63 (five of them bowled) to propel his county to an innings victory. In the other game he played that season, against Sussex (the only time he appeared at New Road), he picked up 5–78 in the first innings of a drawn match.

Busher did not play any cricket in 1909, but August of the following year he appeared twice more for Worcestershire, against Gloucestershire at Cheltenham and against Somerset at Taunton. Worcestershire lost the former match by an innings but won the latter by 295 runs. Busher himself also experienced mixed fortunes in these games: against Gloucestershire he could manage only one wicket, but after a wicketless first innings against Somerset he recorded 5–13 in the second; his last first-class wicket was that of wicket-keeper Arthur Newton.

Busher was born in Solihull; he later emigrated to Australia and died there aged 70 in Turramurra, a suburb of Sydney.

His brother Harold had one game for Warwickshire in 1908.
