= Harold Busher =

English cricketer

Personal information
- Full name: Harold Aston Busher
- Born: 2 August 1876; Birmingham, Warwickshire, England
- Died: 3 October 1954 (aged 78); Sydney, New South Wales, Australia
- Batting: Right-handed
- Relatives: Sydney Busher (brother)

Domestic team information
- Years: Team
- 1913–1914: Suffolk
- 1908: Warwickshire

Career statistics
Competition	First-class
Matches	1
Runs scored	15
Batting average	15.00
100s/50s	–/–
Top score	15
Balls bowled	–
Wickets	–
Bowling average	–
5 wickets in innings	–
10 wickets in match	–
Best bowling	–
Catches/stumpings	–/–
- Source: Cricinfo, 27 December 2011

Harold Aston Busher (2 August 1876 – 3 October 1954) was an English cricketer. Busher was a right-handed batsman. He was born in Birmingham.

Busher made a single first-class appearance for Warwickshire against Gloucestershire at Edgbaston in the 1908 County Championship. Gloucestershire made 165 in their first-innings, in response Warwickshire made 229 in their first-innings, with Busher being dismissed for 15 runs by Edward Dennett. Gloucestershire made 328 in their second-innings, leaving Warwickshire a target of 265 to win. Warwickshire could only manage to make 204 all out, with Busher ending the innings unbeaten on 0. This was his only major appearance for Warwickshire.

He played for Suffolk in the 1913 and 1914 Minor Counties Championship, making six appearances. He died in McMahons Point, Sydney, Australia on 3 October 1954. His brother, Sydney, also played first-class cricket.
