= Leonard Busher =

English writer

Leonard Busher (fl. 1614) was an English writer, pioneer on religious toleration. Busher is known as an early advocate of full liberty of conscience.

== Life ==
Leonard Busher was a Londoner who spent some time in Amsterdam, Dutch Republic. In 1608, he became acquainted with the Puritan leaders John Robinson, John Smyth and Thomas Helwys, who were excommunicated for opposing the Church of England. After returning to England, Busher adopted the Dissenters principles and credobaptism, joining the White's Alley church, who was returned from Amsterdam, led by Helwys.

== Works ==
Busher's only published work was entitled Religious Peace; or, a Plea for Liberty of Conscience, long since presented to King James and the High Court of Parliament then sitting, by L. B., Citizen of London, and printed in the year 1614; no copy of this 1614 edition is known. His treatise advocates religious toleration, freedom to print, and to speak one’s mind about religion. It also calls for the resettlement of the Jews into England, although professor of Judaic studies, Mel Scult points out that this is motivated by the desire to convert them to Christianity. In it he speaks of his poverty, due to persecution, which prevented his publishing two other works he had written: A Scourge of small Cords wherewith Antichrist and his Ministers might be driven out of the Temple and A Declaration of certain False Translations in the New Testament. Neither of these books appears to have been published, nor is any manuscript known to be extant. Religious Peace was reissued in 1646 (London), with an epistle ‘to the Presbyterian reader’ by H. B., probably Henry Burton. This edition was licensed for the press by John Bachilor, who was on its account ferociously attacked by Thomas Edwards (Gangræna, iii. 102–5).

A reprint of the 1646 edition, with an historical introduction by Edward Bean Underhill, was issued by the Hanserd Knollys Society in 1846. According to David Masson, Busher's book ‘is certainly the earliest known publication in which full liberty of conscience is openly advocated’ (Masson, Milton, iii.102). It has been suggested that James I was influenced by it when he declared to parliament in 1614, ‘No state can evidence that any religion or heresy was ever extirpated by the sword or by violence, nor have I ever judged it a way of planting the truth.’
