= Pardon Tillinghast =

English colonist in North America (1625–1718)

- Born: c. 1625; Sussex, England (baptized) (Note: Tillinghast's family home was in Sussex county, and he was baptized in the Sussex village of Streat, but this only confirms his place of baptism, does not confirm that his mother was physically in Streat when he was born.)
- Died: 29 January 1718; Providence, Colony of Rhode Island and Providence Plantations
- Resting place: Tillinghast Burial Ground, Benefit Street, Providence
- Education: Sufficient to write and publish a book
- Occupations: cooper, merchant, clergyman
- Spouse(s): (1) Sarah Butterworth (2) Lydia Taber
- Children: (first wife): Sarah, John, Mary; (second wife): Lydia, Pardon, Philip, Benjamin, Abigail, Joseph, Mercy, Hannah, Elizabeth
- Parent(s): Pardon Tillinghast and Sarah Browne

Pardon Tillinghast (1625–1718) was an early settler of Providence, in the English Colony of Rhode Island and Providence Plantations. A cooper by profession in England, he emigrated to the colony about 1645, and became a successful merchant. Later in life he became a pastor of the Baptist Church of Providence, serving without compensation for nearly four decades before his death in 1718, aged about 96.

== Life ==
Baptized in 1625 in Streat, Sussex, England, Pardon Tillinghast was the son of Pardon Tillinghast and Sarah Browne of Ifield, Sussex. His paternal grandparents were John Tillinghast and Alice Pardon of Streat in Sussex, and his maternal grandparents were Reverend Benjamin Browne and Sarah Leachford of Ifield. His grandfather, John Tillinghast, attended Cambridge University, earning a Bachelor of Arts degree in 1581/2, a Master of Arts degree in 1585, and then served as the rector at Streat from 1593 to 1624.

An uncle was John Tillinghast, a Fifth Monarchist.

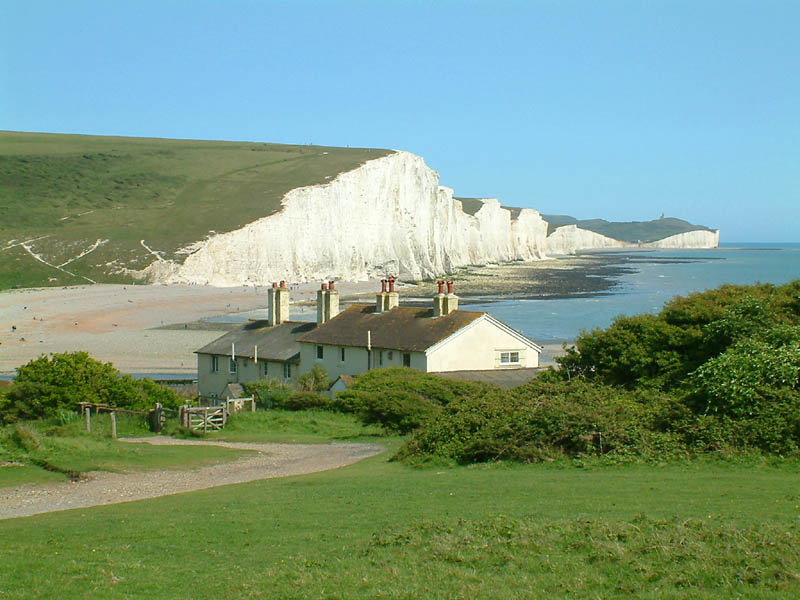
Tillinghast was reported to be born near the Seven Sisters cliffs in Sussex.

While still in England, Pardon Tillinghast may have served as a soldier under Oliver Cromwell and participated in the battle of Marston Moor. He was in Providence by 19 January 1646 (Note: This date has been incorrectly interpreted by several writers as being 19 November 1645. The date was actually written "19th of eleventh month" [1645/6] which at that period of time meant 19 January. In the English colonies, up until about 1752, March was the first month of the year, and January was the 11th month.) when he was received as one who would get a "quarter share" of parcels to be distributed. His reason for emigrating from England may have been the religious intolerance at the time. Tillinghast had little estate when he came to New England, and in 1650 he was taxed three shillings and four pence, a fairly low amount compared to other inhabitants.

In 1658 he became a Providence freeman, but the following year he had a deed of land in Newport from Benedict Arnold, and was called an "Inhabitant of Newport" in the deed. While living in Newport, he became involved in importing and selling dry goods, and appears to have had a brewery, based on a 1684 deed in which he conveys a "brewhous" to his son John, along with his other Newport properties. About 1665 he was back in Providence when he received a lot there in a division of lands, and between 1672 and 1700 he served for six one-year terms as a Deputy to the General Assembly representing Providence.

Tillinghast was a cooper like both his father and his sons, but also was a successful merchant. In 1680 he was granted 20 square feet "for building a storehouse with privilege of a wharf, over against his dwelling house." In doing this, he had built the first wharf in Providence, and is thus recognized as the founding pioneer of the town's maritime trade. Subsequently, trade opened between Providence and other partners, from nearby colonies to as far as the West Indies and Europe. For the times, Tillinghast became a fairly wealthy man, and when he died, his estate, excluding real estate, was valued at £1,542. Putting this into perspective, of 78 Providence inventories between 1716 and 1726, his was the third highest in value.

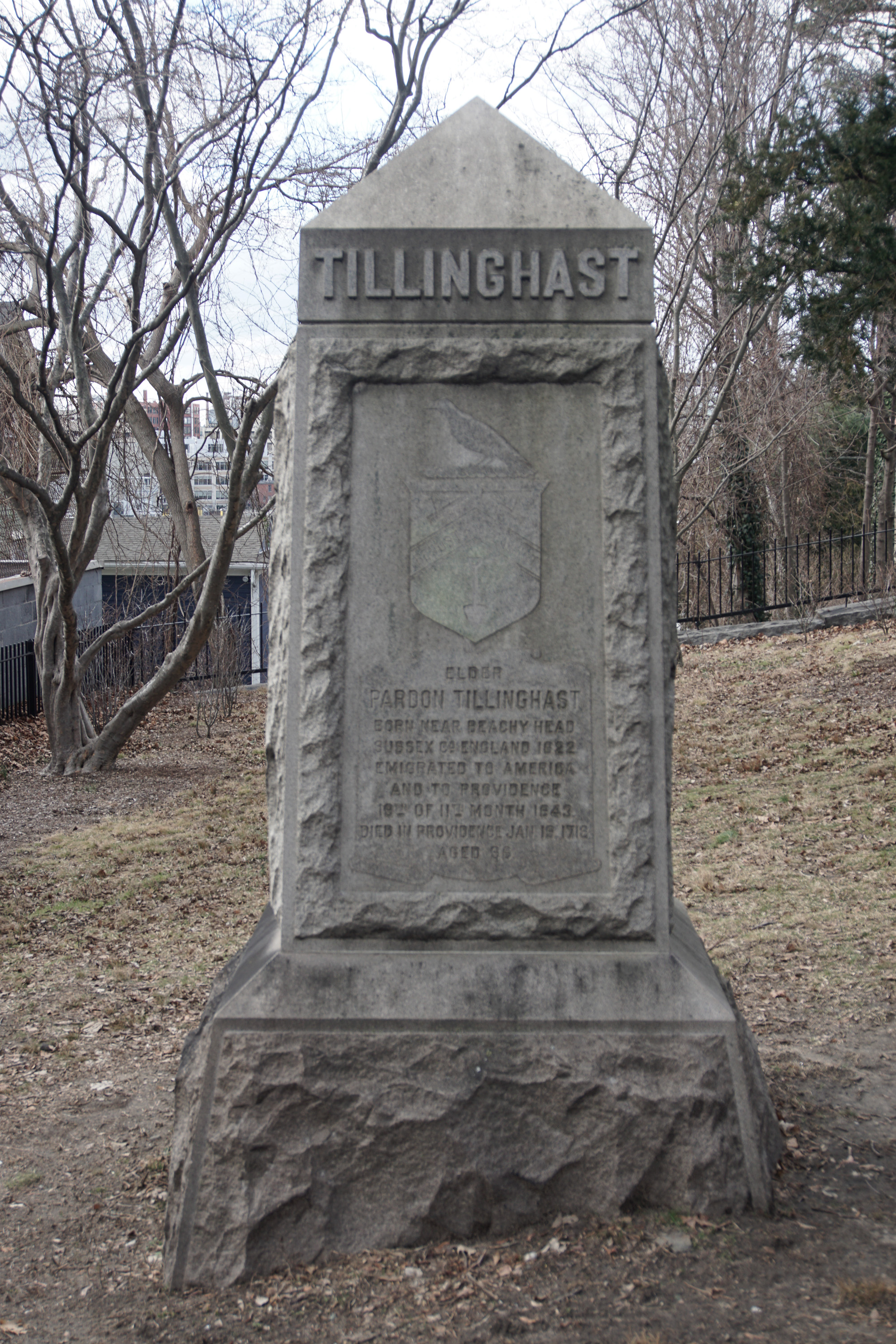
Grave monument for Elder Pardon Tillinghast on Benefit Street, in Providence

At Some point in his life, Tillinghast became an avid Baptist, and in October 1674 he and Stephen Harding were arrested in the Massachusetts Bay Colony, and charged with visiting the Puritan town of Mendon in order to "Seduce People to their corrupt opinions." The two men appeared before the county court, but with no one present to prosecute them, they were admonished and released after being ordered to pay court costs. In 1681 Tillinghast became the pastor of the First Baptist Church in Providence, the oldest Baptist congregation in America, established by Roger Williams in 1638. He served in that capacity without remuneration from 1681 until his death in 1718, and was the sixth pastor of this congregation, being preceded by Roger Williams, Chad Browne, Thomas Olney, William Wickenden, and Gregory Dexter. He was described by Baptist historian, Morgan Edwards, as being remarkable for his plainness and his piety. He was the author of Water-Baptism Plainly Proved by Scripture to Be a Gospel Precept (Boston, 1689). In 1700 at his own expense, he built the first meeting house for his congregation, described as a "rude affair" in the shape of a hay cap with a fireplace in the middle with the smoke escaping from a hole in the roof. In 1711 he deeded the building to the church and described the congregation as adhering to Six Principle Baptist tenets.

While serving as a clergyman, Tillinghast continued to be active with civic responsibilities as well, and served on the Providence Town Council during most of the years from 1688 to 1707, and was also the town Treasurer from 1687 to 1707. Well advanced in years, he wrote his will on 15 December 1715, and it was proved on 11 February 1718. His death date was 29 January 1718, (Note: Recorded as 1717/8 in the original Providence records) and he was buried in a family cemetery in Providence that remains extant, though any original markers have been replaced with a single family monument.

== Family and descendants ==
Pardon Tillinghast married his first wife, Sarah Butterworth around 1653. Sarah was also the name of their oldest child, born in 1654. With his first wife he had three children. There is no proof that Sarah Tillinghast, daughter of Pardon Tillinghast, was the Sarah that married Joseph Hearnden. The Tillingast Family Association expert in the early generations, Wayne Tillinghast, has spent years researching original documents in Rhode Island and has not found any proof that Sarah survived beyond 1671.

His oldest surviving son, John, married Isabel, the daughter of John Sayles and Mary Williams, and the granddaughter of Providence founder Roger Williams. His youngest child by this marriage, Mary, married Benjamin Carpenter, the son of Providence proprietor William Carpenter and his wife Elizabeth Arnold who was the daughter of another Providence proprietor, William Arnold.

Tillinghast married a second time, on 16 April 1664, to Lydia Taber, the daughter of Philip Taber and Lydia Masters, and this marriage produced nine more children. Their son Pardon married Mary Keech, the daughter of George and Mary Keech, and had five children, two of whom, Mary and Mercy, were both wives of Colonel Peter Mawney, a member of Rhode Island's short-lived Huguenot settlement. Their son Philip married Martha Holmes, the daughter of Jonathan Holmes, and the granddaughter of early Baptist minister Obadiah Holmes. Their third son, Benjamin, married Sarah Rhodes, a daughter of Malachi Rhodes and Mary Carder, a granddaughter of Zachariah Rhodes and Joanne Arnold, and a great-granddaughter of William Arnold. Their fourth son, Joseph, first married Freelove Stafford, the daughter of Samuel Stafford and Mercy Westcott, and granddaughter of early Providence proprietor Stukely Westcott. One of Joseph's descendants by a second marriage was writer Richard Henry Dana Jr.

Tillinghast's granddaughter Mary, daughter of son John, married Richard Ward who served briefly as the Deputy Governor of the Rhode Island colony, then served a one-year term as governor. Their son, Samuel Ward served several terms as governor of the colony and became one of Rhode Island's two delegates to the Continental Congress. Samuel Ward's great-granddaughter, Julia Ward Howe, was the noted writer and poet who wrote the lyrics to The Battle Hymn of the Republic. Other notable descendants of Pardon Tillinghast include Nicholas Brown Jr., for whom Brown University is named, and Stephen Arnold Douglas who engaged Abraham Lincoln in a series of famed debates in 1858 prior to a Senate race, then later lost to him in the 1860 presidential election.

== See also ==
- First Baptist Church in America
