= First Baptist Church in the City of New York =

Church in Manhattan, New York

Coordinates: 40°47′3″N 73°58′49″W

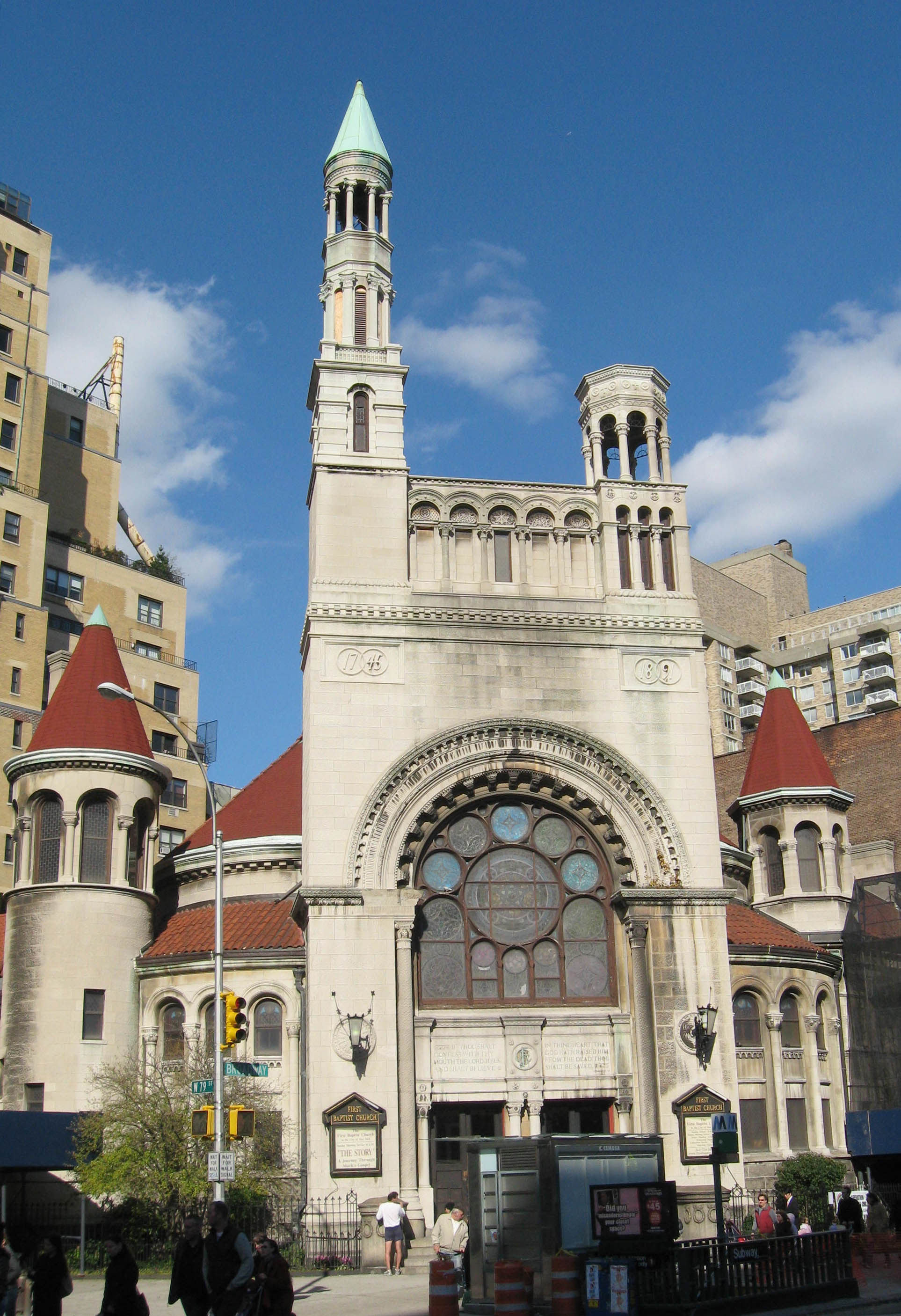
The sanctuary at Broadway and 79th Street, with asymmetrical towers

The First Baptist Church in the City of New York is a Baptist church on the Upper West Side of Manhattan, New York City. Its current structure was built in 1890–93 at the intersection of Broadway and West 79th Street. The church is affiliated with the Southern Baptist Convention.

== History ==
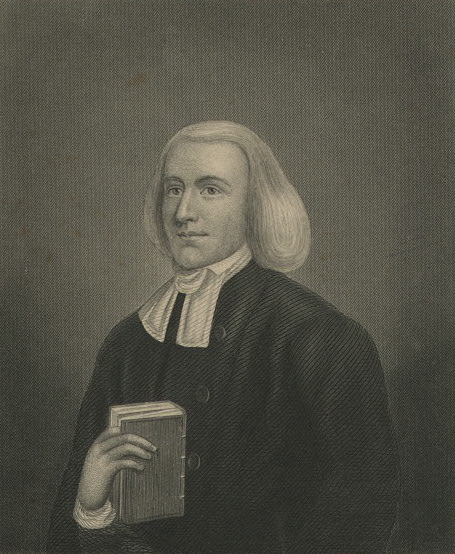
Rev. John Gano, George Washington's chaplain and captain in the Continental Army

Early attempts to form a Baptist church in Flushing, Queens were organized by William Wickenden and others in the 1650s.

In 1745, Jeremiah Dodge settled in New York City, and began holding prayer meetings in his home. He was a member of the Fishkill Baptist Church. When he learned of Benjamin Miller at nearby Scotch Plains Baptist Church in Scotch Plains, New Jersey, he asked him to come and hold preaching services at the prayer meetings, which he did. Other ministers preached to this group from time to time, and in 1753, all thirteen of them joined the Scotch Plains Baptist Church after Miller had baptized some of them. They were organized as an independent Baptist church on June 19, 1762 by Benjamin Miller and John Gano — the latter being called as Pastor – and took the name "First Baptist Church in the City of New York". Gano served as pastor until 1776 when he became Chaplain in General Washington's American Army. The congregation's first sanctuary was at 35 Gold Street in Lower Manhattan, built in 1759–60.

== 19th century ==
From 1801–02, the First Baptist Church built a new stone structure at its site on Gold Street.

Near the start of the American Civil War, the church building was host to a Union prayer meeting of all denominations. Present at the meeting was Senator James R. Doolittle, giving brief remarks, and stating "Great God Almighty, shall just vengeance sleep forever?".

Under the leadership of Dr. Spencer Cone, the congregation relocated in 1842 to a Gothic revival structure at 354 Broome Street at the intersection of Elizabeth Street. This was also the headquarters of the Baptist Home and Foreign Mission Board. This sanctuary is still in use today by the Evangelical Lutheran Church of St. Matthew.

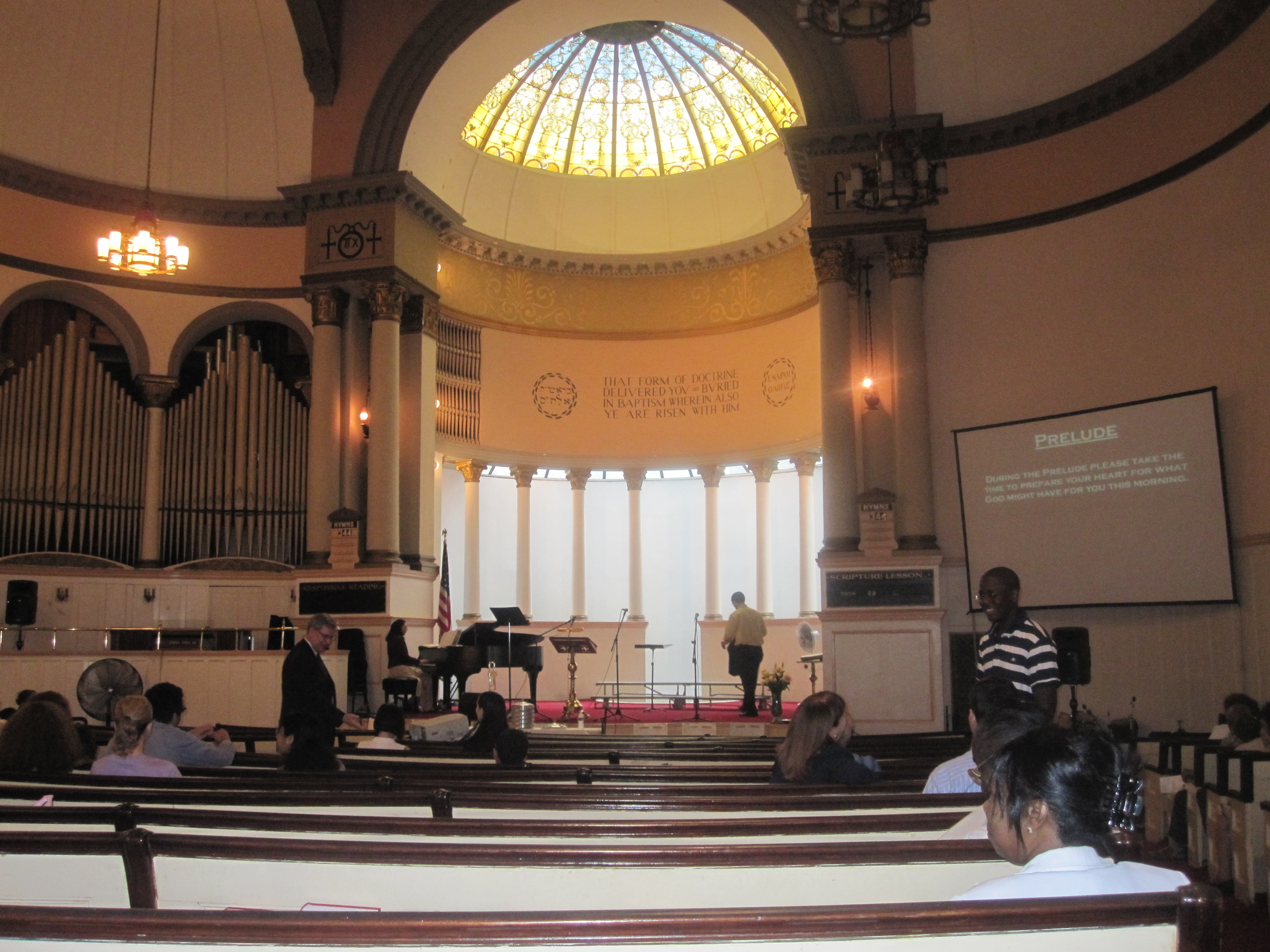
Inside the sanctuary of the First Baptist Church

== Sanctuary at Broadway and 79th Street ==
The First Baptist Church relocated to the present facility in 1890. It occupies a site that, because of a bend in the direction of Broadway, is prominent from a distance down the avenue. The building is set at an angle of 45 degrees to the street grid.

In the sanctuary, the Hebrew text is the essence of Genesis 1:1, "In the beginning, God..." The Greek text is the essence of John 1:1, "In the beginning was the Word (Jesus Christ)." In the upper right are the Greek symbols of Alpha and Omega, the first and last letters of the Greek alphabet. Jesus refers to Himself as the Alpha and Omega in Revelation 1:8 and 22:13. In the upper left are the Greek characters pi and chi. This may stand for Pater and Christos, Father and Christ.
