= Samuel Peto =

Samuel Peto can refer to:

- Samuel Petto (c.1624-1711), English Puritan clergyman
- Samuel Morton Peto (1809-1889), English entrepreneur, civil engineer and railway developer
