= Old Baptist Parsonage =

Old Baptist Parsonage may refer to:

- Old Baptist Parsonage (Wellington, Ohio), listed on the NRHP in Lorain County, Ohio
- Old Baptist Parsonage (Scotch Plains, New Jersey), listed on the NRHP in Union County, New Jersey
