= Six Principle Baptist Church =

1703 church in Rhode Island, United States

- U.S. National Register of Historic Places
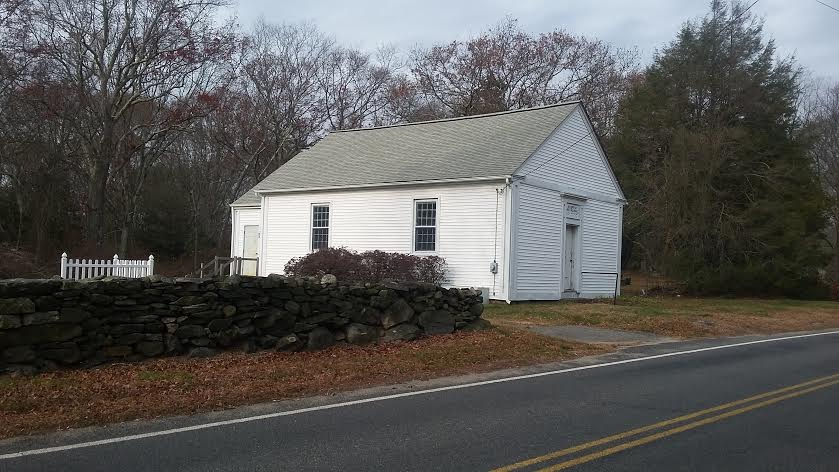
- Old Baptist Meeting House, sign states the congregation was established in 1665

- Location within Rhode Island Location within the United States
- Location: 921 Old Baptist Road, North Kingstown, Rhode Island
- Coordinates: 41°35′34″N 71°29′29″W
- Built: 1703
- Architectural style: Greek Revival
- NRHP reference No.: 78000022
- Added to NRHP: November 21, 1978

Stony Lane Six Principle Baptist Church, also known as the Old Baptist Meeting House, is a historic church in North Kingstown, Rhode Island. As of 2009 it was one of the last surviving historical congregations of the Six Principle Baptist denomination and one of the oldest churches in the United States.

== History ==
The cemetery and meeting house date to approximately 1703 when the land was deeded for use as meeting house. General Six-Principle Baptists were a denomination that developed out of the First Baptist Church in America in Providence. Rhode Island founder Roger Williams was active in both Providence and nearby North Kingstown (Wickford) during this period. The permanent congregation in North Kingstown was likely founded after 1664 when Reverend Thomas Baker, a member of the Newport congregation, removed to North Kingstown. The meeting house underwent major renovations in a Greek Revival style in 1842 although the original 18th century core of the building is believed to be present underneath the Greek Revival modifications. The church building was added to the National Register of Historic Places in 1978. As of 2009 the church still holds weekly Sunday morning services at 10:30AM, and the pastor is John Wheeler.

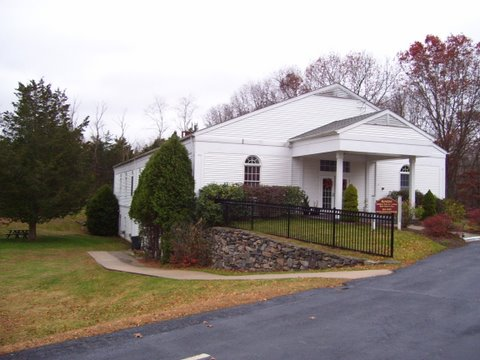
Newer Six Principle Baptist Church building adjacent to the older building

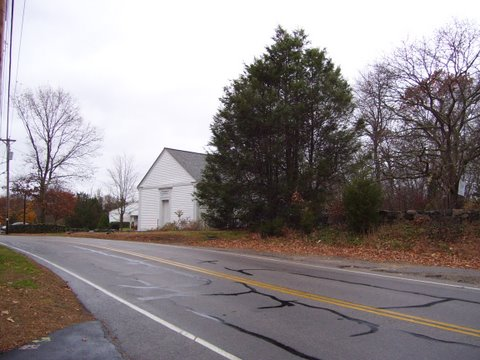
Six Principle Baptist Church and cemetery to the right (newer building in background)

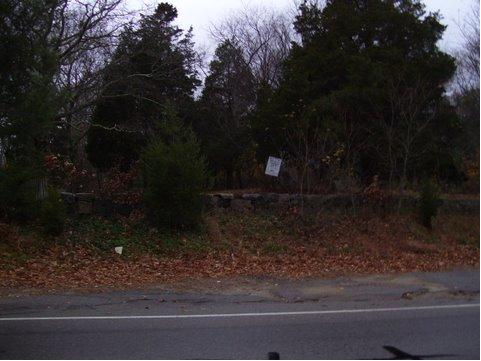
Six Principle Baptist Church cemetery to the right of the church

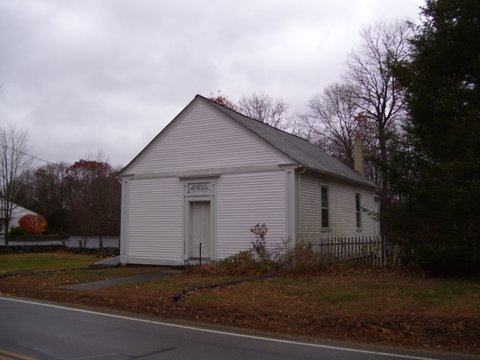
Six Principle Baptist Church

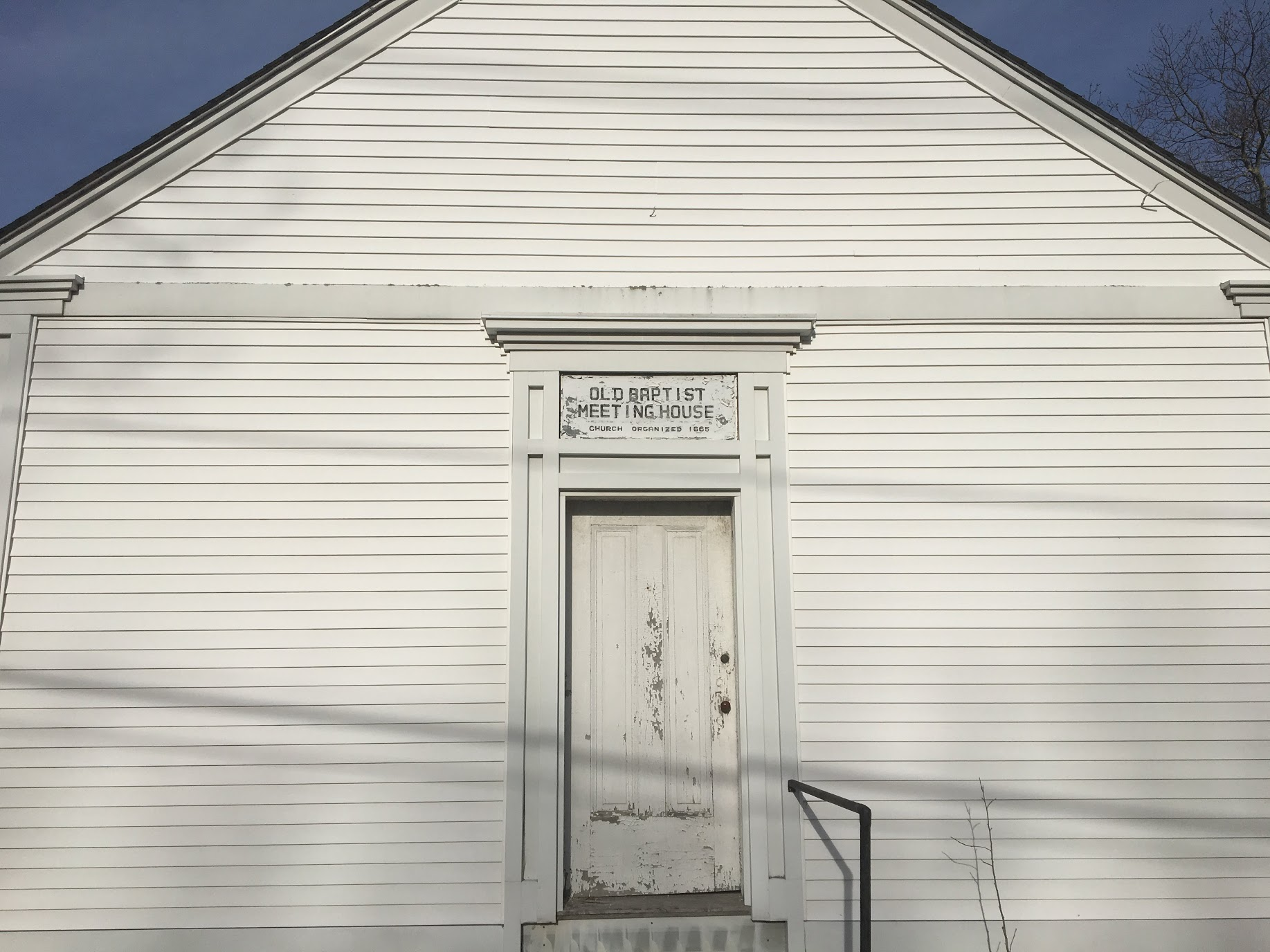
Old Meeting House

== See also ==
- Baptists in the United States
- General Six-Principle Baptists
- National Register of Historic Places listings in Washington County, Rhode Island
