= John Tillinghast =

English clergyman and Fifth-monarchy man

John Tillinghast (1604–1655) was an English clergyman and Fifth-monarchy man. He is known for his confrontation with Oliver Cromwell, and millenarian writings.

== Life ==
He was son of John Tillinghast, rector of Streat, Sussex, and was born there in 1604 (baptised 25 Sept.) The regicide Robert Tichborne was his uncle. From the grammar school of Newport, Essex, he went to Cambridge, and on 24 March 1620-1, his age being sixteen, was admitted pensioner of Gonville and Caius College; he graduated B.A. 1624-5.

His nephew Pardon Tillinghast settled in Rhode Island in 1645.

His first known preferment was the rectory of Tarring Neville, Sussex, to which he was inducted on 30 July 1636. On 29 September 1637 he was inducted, in succession to his father, as rector of Streat; he held the living till 1643, when he was known as a preacher in London. He became an independent before the end of 1650, and was admitted member of the newly formed church at Syleham, Suffolk. On 22 January 1651 the independents of Great Yarmouth called him there as assistant to William Bridge on 15 April he and his wife Mary were transferred from the Syleham fellowship to that of Yarmouth. On 24 June 1651 he was re-baptised.

On 13 January 1652 the independent churches of Cookley, Suffolk, Fressingfield, Suffolk, and Trunch, Norfolk, presented simultaneous calls to Tillinghast. The Yarmouth flock released him on 27 January, and he elected to go to Trunch, where he held the rectory.

His millenarian opinions, which he shared with (perhaps adopted from) Richard Breviter, or Brabiter, of North Walsham, were of a purely spiritual type, and his general theology was in strict accordance with the Thirty-nine Articles. In the spring of 1655 he came up to London to remonstrate with Cromwell and console the imprisoned 'saints' of his party. He visited Christopher Feake in Windsor Castle. Nathaniel Brewster, rector of Alby, Norfolk, introduced him to Cromwell, whom he addressed in frank terms; Brewster felt he went too far. Shortly after this he died in London, early in June 1655. His son John was baptised at Yarmouth on 24 June 1651.

== Works ==
He published:

- Demetrivs his Opposition to Reformation, 1642, dedicated to Isabel, wife of Henry Rich, 1st Earl of Holland and others.
- Generation Work, 1653, 8vo; part ii. 1654, 8vo; part iii. 1654, (title is explained, 'work for the present generation').
- Knovvledge of the Times, 1654.
- A Motive to Generation Work, 1655.

Posthumous were :

- Mr. Tillinghast's Eight Last Sermons, 1656, (edited, with preface, by Christopher Feake).
- Six Several Treatises, 1656; edited, from Tillinghast's notes, by Samuel Petto and John Manning; reprinted 1663,.
- Elijah's Mantle: or the Remains of ... Tillinghast, 1658; nine sermons, edited by Petto, Manning, and Samuel Habergham.

The regicide Robert Tichborne was not John's uncle. Tichborne was the uncle of his first wife, Dorothie Tichborne.

== Others of the name ==
Another John Tillinghast, son of Pardon Tillinghast of Alfriston, Sussex, matriculated from Magdalen Hall, Oxford, on 14 July 1642, aged 17. Another Pardon Tillinghast, born at Sevencliffe, near Beachey Head, about 1622, became Baptist minister at Providence, Rhode Island.
