= John Gano =

American Baptist minister (1727–1804)

The Reverend John Gano
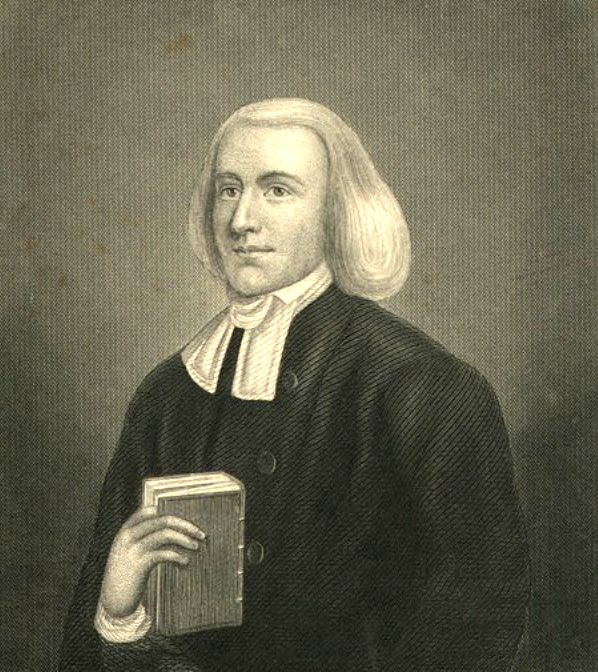

1st Chaplain of the Kentucky Legislature
- In office November 8, 1798 – August 10, 1804

Member of the Board of Regents of the University of the State of New York
- In office November 12, 1784 – April 13, 1787

Personal details
- Born: July 22, 1727 Hopewell, New Jersey, Province of New Jersey
- Died: August 10, 1804 (aged 77) Frankfort, Kentucky
- Resting place: Frankfort Cemetery, Frankfort, Kentucky
- Spouse(s): Mary Stites (m. 1755; died 1792); Sarah Hunt (m. 1793)
- Relations: James Manning (minister) (brother in law); William Hubbel Price (great grandson); William Price Sanders (great grandson); Richard Montgomery Gano (great grandson); Howard Robard Hughes (descendant); Francis Gano Benedict (descendant); Wright Brothers (3rd great grandnephews)
- Children: 11 including Stephen Gano
- Education: Princeton University
- Occupation: Minister • Soldier
- Awards: Membership in the Society of Cincinnati
- Nickname(s): The Fighting Chaplain; The Hero of Chatterton Hill

Military service
- Allegiance: United States
- Branch/service: Continental Army
- Years of service: 1776 - 1783
- Rank: Brigade Chaplain
- Unit: 19th Continental Regiment
- Battles/wars: See battles: Revolutionary War; Battle of White Plains; George Washington's crossing of the Delaware River; Battle of Trenton; Battle of Forts Clinton and Montgomery; Sullivan-Clinton Expedition

John Gano (July 22, 1727 – August 10, 1804) was an American Baptist minister, patriot, and soldier who served during the American Revolutionary War. He is recognized for founding the First Baptist Church in the City of New York and for his service as a chaplain in the Continental Army, including participation in General George Washington’s crossing of the Delaware River. Allegations that he baptized Washington have been widely circulated, though they remain historically disputed. Gano later served as the First Chaplain of the Kentucky Legislature in 1798. Several of his descendants would go on to serve as military officers, ministers, and important figures in U.S. history.

== Early life ==
Gano was born on July 22, 1727 in Hopewell, New Jersey. He was raised as a Presbyterian. His father was a descendant of French Calvinists (Huguenots) and his mother of English Baptists. After a powerful conversion experience, John Gano eventually became a Calvinist Baptist as a young man after a period of intense study. Gano left the family farm to study at Princeton University (then the College of New Jersey) but left before graduating. Gano was ordained as pastor of the Scotch Plains Baptist Church on May 29, 1754. In 1760, he became the founding pastor of what later became the First Baptist Church in the City of New York. Gano served as pastor of the New York Church until 1787, however, he made long itinerant trips evangelizing throughout the thirteen colonies, asserting

I... had a right to proclaim free grace wherever I went.

Gano travelled throughout the South, Middle Atlantic States, and New England, sometimes being away from home for as long as two years. In 1764, Gano joined several others as an original fellow or trustee for the chartering of the College in the English Colony of Rhode Island and Providence Plantations (the former name for Brown University, originally a Baptist school).

== Revolutionary War ==
During the American Revolution, Gano served as a soldier and a chaplain for the Continental Army. On October 28, 1776, Gano was present at the Battle of White Plains. He was stationed on Chatterton Hill with the 19th Infantry Regiment who were suffering heavy losses from the British. He walked in front of the troops while under fire and encouraged them not to retreat but to keep fighting. He wrote in his memoirs saying "My station in time of action I knew to be with the surgeons, but in this battle I somehow got in the front of the regiment, yet I durst not quit my place for fear of dampening the spirits of the soldiers or of bringing on myself the imputation of cowardice." It was after this battle he earned the nicknames "The Hero of Chatterton Hill" and "The Fighting Chaplain".

On December 26, 1776, Gano participated in George Washington's famous crossing of the Delaware River and was also present at the Battle of Trenton that followed. In the Chaplains and Clergy of the Revolution it states "He (Gano) crossed the Wintry Delaware with the army when it made its fearful midnight march on Trenton, and shared in the dangers of the battle that followed". Gano served at the Battle of Forts Clinton and Montgomery on October 6, 1777 near West Point while serving under General George Clinton. He later took part in the Sullivan-Clinton Expedition in 1779. Gano was chosen by General Washington to say a prayer marking the official end of the American Revolutionary War in 1783.

== Post-war career ==
After the War, Gano returned to his congregation in New York. On May 1, 1784, Gano was elected to the Board of Regents of the University of the State of New York alongside John Jay and Alexander Hamilton. By 1787, Gano moved to Kentucky where he would live at until his death in 1804. On June 17, 1793, future vice-president Aaron Burr wrote Gano a letter congratulating a friend of Gano's named John Edwards (1748-1837) for getting elected to the Kentucky Senate.

On November 9, 1798, Gano was elected as the first chaplain for the Kentucky Legislature as stated in the Journal of the Kentucky House of Representatives "In Senate: Resolved that the Rev. John Gano be appointed chaplain to the general assembly; in which they request the concurrence of this house." He was also a member of the Society of Cincinnati.

== Family ==
His first wife was Mary Stites. They married in 1755 in Queens, New York. They had the following children:

1. John Stites Gano (December 1755 - December 14, 1765), died at 10 years old.

2. Daniel Gano (November 11, 1758 - April 1849), attended Brown University at age 17 but left and joined the Continental Army during the Revolutionary War. He became a captain and served on the staff of General Clinton. He eventually moved to Kentucky after the war.

3. Maragret Peggy Gano (December 29, 1760 - June 11, 1837)

4. Stephen Gano (December 25, 1762 - August 18, 1828), was a notable physician and pastor in New York. He was also a Freemason.

5. Sarah Gano (February 4, 1764 - ?)

6. John Stites Gano (July 14, 1766 - January 1, 1822), became a Major General of the First Division of Ohio Militia in 1804. He later served in the War of 1812. In 1791 he "was a topographical engineer at the head of the engineers making a path for General St. Clair's march to the Indian country, and was present at St. Clair's defeat November 4, 1791." His son was Aaron Goforth Gano, one of the earliest graduates of the United States Military Academy in the class of 1818. Aaron served as a lieutenant in the "Third United States Artillery".

7. Unknown daughter (1768 - ?)

8. Isaac Eaton Gano (May 4, 1770 - October 8, 1811)

9. Susannah Gano (November 8, 1777 - 1856), married John Price in Frankfort, Kentucky. They were the parents of Missouri state senator John G. Price, who was the father of Texas Legislator William Hubbel Price. They also had a daughter named Margaret Hubbel Price, who married Lewis Sanders. Margaret and Lewis were the parents of William Price Sanders, a West Point graduate of the class of 1856. William Price Sanders became a Colonel in the Union Army during the Civil War. Lewis Sanders and Margaret Price also had a daughter who married millionaire James Ben Ali Haggin

10. Richard Montgomery Gano (July 7, 1779 - October 15, 1815), married Elizabeth Ewing in 1797. He became a U.S. Army Brigadier-General during the War of 1812. His son John Allan Gano, became a notable Baptist Minister during the Restoration Movement. John Allan Gano was the father of Richard Montgomery Gano, who served as a Confederate General during the Civil War.

11. William B. Gano ( 1781 - ?)

Mary Stites had a sister named Margaret Stites who married James Manning, a Baptist minister and the first president of Brown University.

Mary Stites died April 23, 1792 and John Gano then married Sarah Hunt on April 15, 1793. They remained married until his death.

== Death ==
Gano died on August 10, 1804, and is buried in the Daughters Of The Revolutionary War Section of the Frankfort Cemetery in Frankfort, Kentucky, just beyond Daniel Boone's grave. Before his death, Gano wrote and published an autobiography of his life.

== Notable Descendants ==
Gano's descendants include:

• Howard Robard Hughes Jr., a billionaire and aviator whose mother was Allene (Gano) Hughes.

• General Richard Montgomery Gano, a Confederate general.

• Francis Gano Benedict, a chemist and inventor of the calorimeter.

• William Hubbell Price, a Confederate Army Captain and Texas State Representative.

•William Price Sanders, a Union Colonel during the Civil War.

• Wright brothers Orville and Wilbur, who invented the first successful airplane were Gano's 3rd great nephews through his sister Susannah.

== Alleged baptism of George Washington ==
In 1889, two of Gano's grandchildren claimed in an affidavit that Gano's eldest daughter told them that Gano had baptized Washington by immersion at Valley Forge when he was one of Washington's chaplains.

The story is rejected by a portion of secular historians. Dr. William Grady in his book What Hath God Wrought: A Biblical Interpretation of American history believes the account to be authentic. Washington biographer and uncle of Howard Hughes, Rupert Hughes, researched the matter and determined that Rev. Gano served with George Clinton's army, not with Washington's, that the location is sometimes given as Valley Forge and sometimes as the Potomac, that there is no documentation of Gano ever being at Valley Forge, that there is nothing in Gano's own correspondence or his biography to suggest that the event took place, and that none of the 42 reputed witnesses ever documented the event.

Washington's church, Anglican, believed in infant baptism and his christening is recorded as taking place on April 5, 1732, about six weeks after he was born.

== Legacy ==
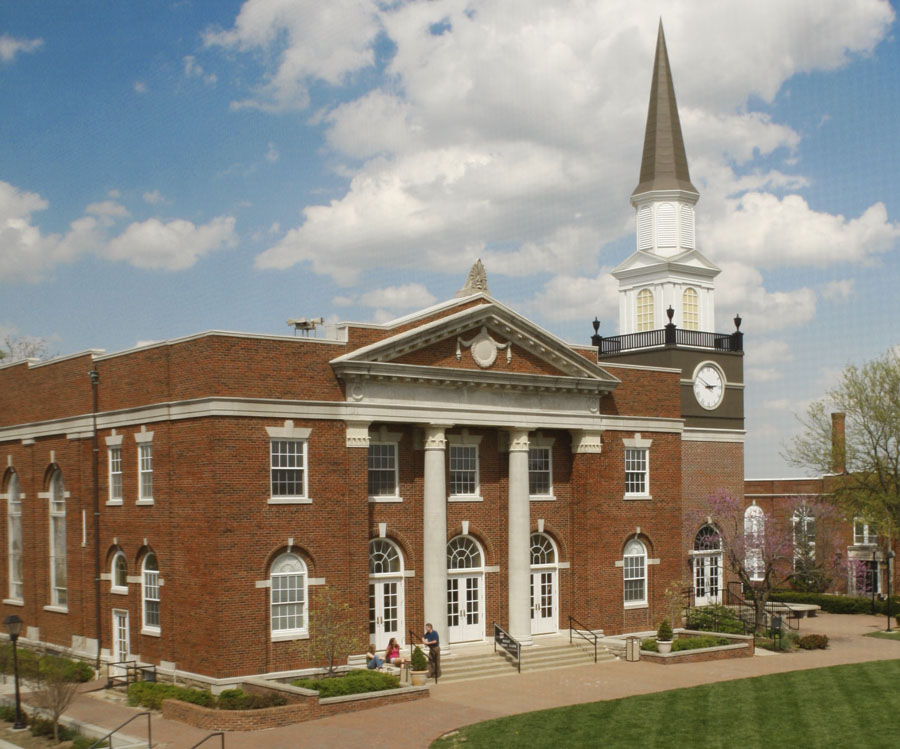
Gano Chapel in 2010

Gano Chapel at William Jewell College in Missouri is named after John Gano, and displays a painting of Gano baptizing Washington. The school takes no stance on whether the baptism of Washington actually took place. The chapel also contains a sword owned by the Marquis de Lafayette that Washington purportedly gave to Gano. The sword is described by historian Mike Loades as a "silver hilted cuttoe with a lion head pommel, an ivory grip decorated with silver wire and a curved blade stamped with ADREA FERARA".

Henry Clay once said of John Gano: “He was a remarkably fervent preacher and distinguished for a simple and effective manner. And of all the preachers I ever listened to, he made me feel the most that religion was a divine reality, I never felt so religious under any one’s preaching as under his,” -Sprague’s annals of the American Pulpit.

On 16 February 2026 the US Army released an article titled Under providence and liberty: George Washington and the sacred birth of the Army Chaplain Corps which stated "Reverend John Gano distinguished himself through both courage and devotion during the American Revolution." and "Gano’s courage was matched by his spiritual leadership."

== See also ==
- John Hurt (chaplain) — Reverend who also served at Valley Forge
- Israel Evans (chaplain) — Reverend who also served at Valley Forge
- List of clergy in the American Revolution

== Bibliography ==
- Gano, John. "A Chaplain of the Revolution: Memoirs of the Rev. John Gano." Historical Magazine, 5 (November 1861), pp. 330–335.
- Wolever, Terry. "The Life & Ministry of John Gano - Volume I." Springfield, MO: Particular Baptist Press, 1998.
- John Gano, Biographical memoirs of the late Rev. John Gano, of Frankfort (Kentucky): formerly of the city of New York (Printed by Southwick and Hardcastle for J. Tiebout, 1806).
