= Stephen Gano =

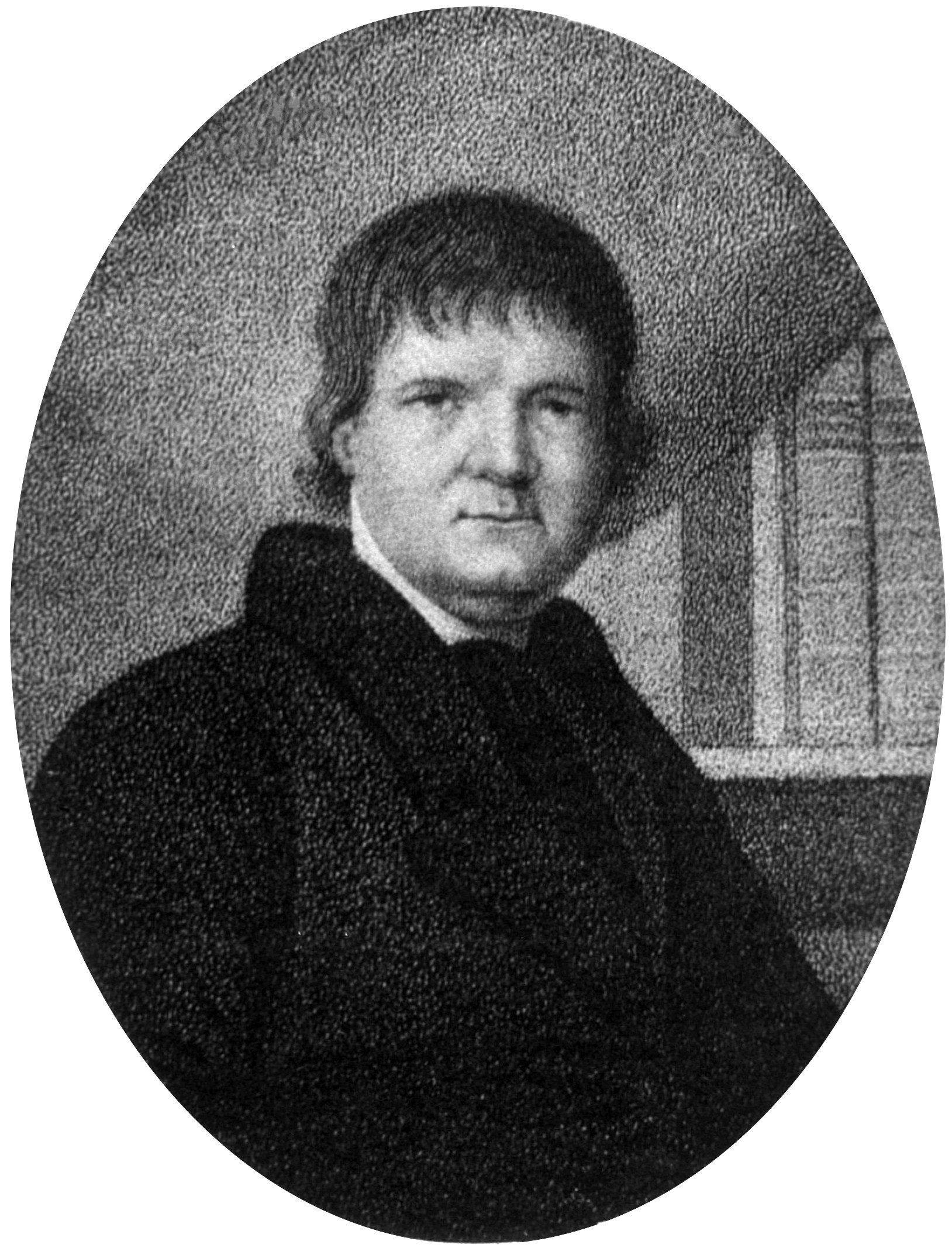
- Born: December 25, 1762
- Died: August 18, 1828 (aged 65)
- Occupation: physician

Stephen Gano (December 25, 1762 – August 18, 1828) was a physician and early pastor of the First Baptist Church in America in Providence, Rhode Island.

== Early life and Revolutionary War service ==
Stephen Gano was the third son born to Rev. John Gano, a prominent Baptist evangelist, and Sarah Stites. Gano was born in New York City while his father was pastoring Gold Street Baptist Church (First Baptist Church in the City of New York). Stephen Gano planned on attending Brown University where his uncle, James Manning, was President, but the Revolutionary War prevented him from enrolling. So at the age of thirteen Gano went to study medicine with his uncle, Dr. Stites. At age 17 in 1779 Gano served briefly as a surgeon's mate in the American army, then resigned to become a surgeon's mate on a privateer. Shipwrecked, marooned, and then taken prisoner by the British, he was confined in leg irons on a prison ship for some time.

His father had previously joined the military as a chaplain, and a Gano family legend holds that John Gano baptized George Washington. No historian or biographer of Washington accepts this tale.

He was admitted as an honorary member of the New York Society of the Cincinnati on July 4, 1784.

== Career in medicine and ministry ==
After the Revolution, Stephen Gano practiced medicine in Orangetown, New York and in 1782 married Cornelia Vavasour, daughter of a British officer in New York City. In 1783 he had a conversion and turned to the ministry, and in 1786 he was ordained in the Gold Street Church by his uncle, Dr. Manning, and other clergy. He served as a Pastor of the Baptist Church at Hillsdale, NY and then Hudson, NY. In Hudson, his wife died leaving Gano with several young children, and in 1789 he married Polly, daughter of Colonel Tallmadge in Stamford, Connecticut. They had several more children. Gano then served as a missionary to the Old Northwest Territory and is credited with establishing a church at Columbia, Ohio, near present-day Cincinnati, the first Baptist church in the territory.

In 1792, Dr. Gano became the pastor of the First Baptist Church in America in Providence, Rhode Island where he remained until his death. Many revivals took place throughout his tenure at the church with expanding church membership and baptisms.

In 1797 Polly died, and in 1799 he married Mary Brown, daughter of Professor Joseph Brown, of Brown University, but Mary died in December 1800. Next Gano married Mrs. Joanna Latting, of Hillsdale, New York, but they separated permanently in 1803 when she accused him of being a worshiper of the Devil because he was a Freemason.

Dr. Gano received the honorary degree of M.A. from Brown University in 1800 and was an Overseer of Brown University from 1794 until his death. He also served on the Providence School Committee for many years. Gano published several of his sermons and other writings. Gano Street in Providence takes its name from Gano's surname.

== See also ==
- First Baptist Church in America
