= William Hubbel Price =

American soldier, politician and minister

William H. Price
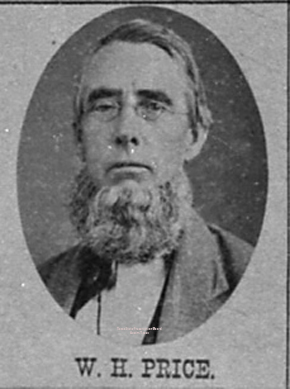

Member of the 15th Texas Legislature from the 21st district

Texas Legislator
- In office April 18, 1876 – January 14, 1879

Personal details
- Born: January 29, 1820 Kentucky
- Died: October 31, 1895 Rockwall, Texas (aged 75)
- Spouse: Charity Ann Waller (m. 1841)
- Relations: John Gano (great-grandfather); William Price Sanders (cousin); Richard Montgomery Gano (cousin); John G. Price (father)
- Children: 6
- Occupation: soldier • minister • politician • farmer
- Nickname: W. H.

Military service
- Allegiance: United States of America; Confederate States of America
- Branch/service: United States Army; Missouri State Guard
- Years of service: 1846 (U.S.A); 1861–1863 (C.S.A)
- Rank: Private (U.S.A.); Captain (C.S.A.)
- Battles/wars: Mexican-American War; Civil War: Battle of Elkhorn Tavern

William Hubbel Price (January 29, 1820 – October 31, 1895) was an American soldier, politician, and minister from the state of Missouri who later served as a legislator in Texas after the Civil War.

== Early life ==
William Hubbel Price was born on January 29, 1820, to John G. Price (1797 -1867) and America Wilson in Kentucky. John G. Price, was a Missouri Senator and the grandson of Revolutionary War patriot and chaplain John Gano, the minister who allegedly baptized George Washington. William Price was a cousin of Civil War Generals William Price Sanders and Richard Montgomery Gano through their great-grandfather John Gano.

== Mexican-American War ==
William Price enlisted as a private in "Julian's" Company in the 3rd Missouri Mounted Volunteers during the Mexican-American War on August 31, 1846, and was discharged at Fort Leavenworth on October 1, 1846. He later reenlisted as a private with Company B in the 3rd Missouri Infantry Regiment during the war.

== Between Wars ==
In April 1853, he and his father John G. Price helped found Mount Zion Baptist Church, which was the first brick church built outside of Liberty, Missouri. William Price served as a pastor for the church and was one of the last two surviving male members alive at the time of the churchs founding.

== Civil War ==
During the Civil War Price served as a captain in the Missouri State Guard under General Sterling Price. He served at the Battle of Elkhorn Tavern in March 1862 and was later medically discharged in Memphis, Tennessee for chronic ophthalmia.

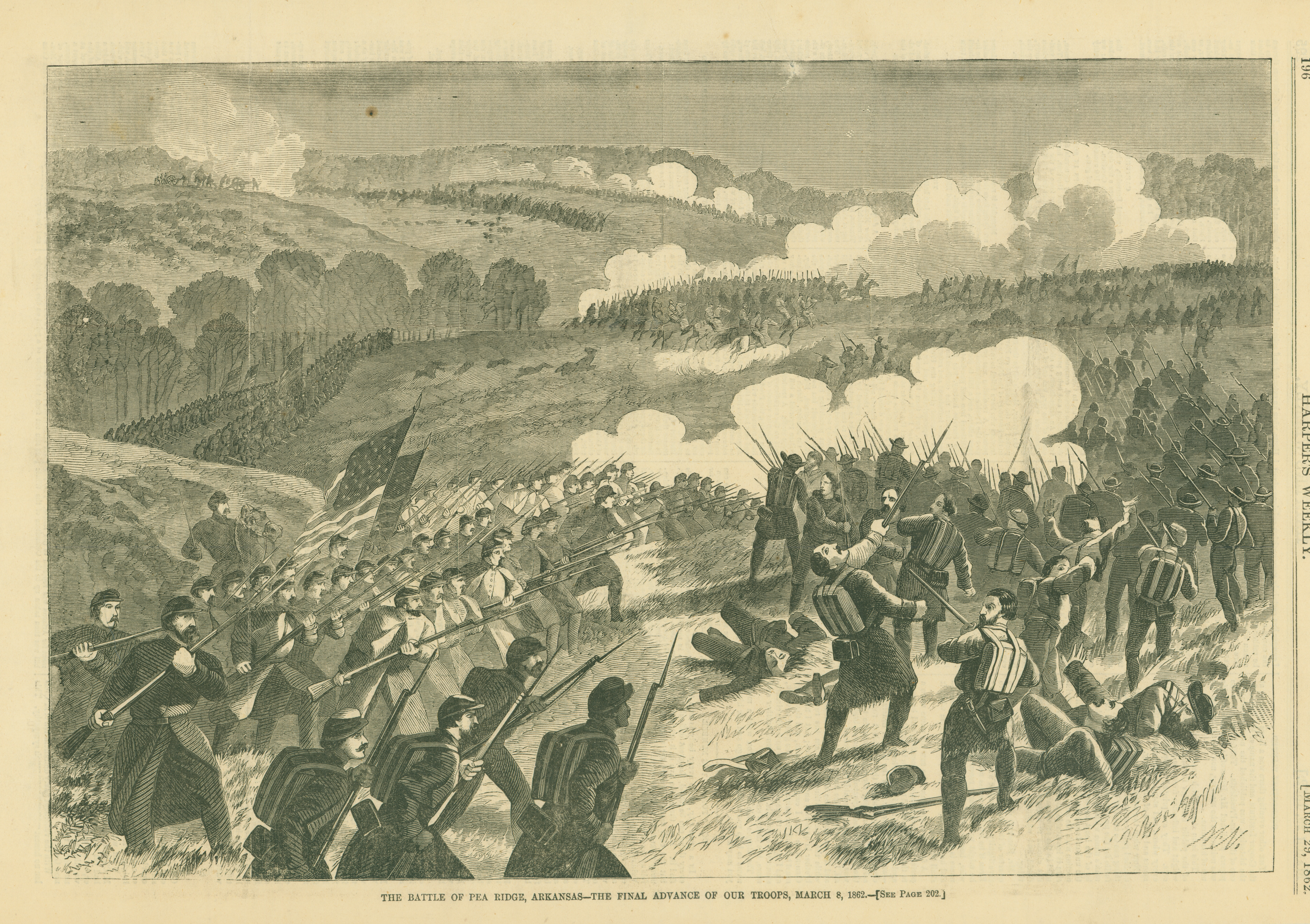
Defeat of Rebel forces at the battle of Pea Ridge, Harper's Weekly.

His father John G. Price was a southern unionist, who remained loyal to the Union "By staying home and funding government troops (Union Soldiers)" according to his oath of loyalty to the Union he signed on October 6, 1866, at the age of 69.

== Family ==
He married Charity Ann Waller on 26 May 1841, and they had four daughters and two sons together. The daughters were named Grace, Susan, America, and Florence. The sons were named G. Sterling and John N. Price. His daughter Grace married Jeremiah Crabb Griffith, a Confederate veteran, Susan married J.M. Taylor of Ada, Oklahoma, America E. married Napoleon Jouette of Dallas, Texas, Florence married firstly Charles Harris then remarried T.W. Ivy after Charles death.

G. Sterling Price was named after General Sterling Price whom William Price served under during the Civil War. Grace's obituary claims William Hubbel Price and General Sterling Price were "first cousin(s)".

== Later life ==
After being discharged from the Confederate army William Price moved to Rockwall, Texas in 1863. During this time he "engaged in agricultural pursuits". On 16 April 1876 he was elected as a state representative of the 21st district for the 15th Texas Legislature. It was the first office he ever held and he stated "it would be his last". He also served as a Baptist minister for more than 50 years. On 5 September 1885 he was described as "Rev. Wm. Price", "To begin debate at Whitt" by the Wise County Morning newspaper in Texas.

== Death ==
He died on October 31, 1895, and was buried in Mount Zion Cemetery in Rockwall, Texas.
