= William P. Sanders =

Union Army officer (1833–1863)

William Price Sanders
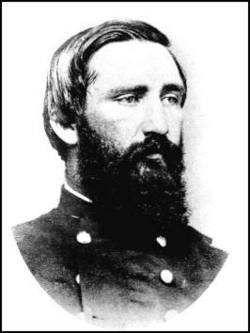
- Born: August 12, 1833 near Frankfort, Kentucky
- Died: November 19, 1863 (aged 30); Knoxville, Tennessee
- Burial place: Chattanooga National Cemetery, Chattanooga, Tennessee
- Military career
- Allegiance: United States of America; Union
- Branch: United States Army; Union Army
- Service years: 1856–1863
- Rank: Colonel, USV; Brigadier General, USV (unconfirmed)
- Conflicts: American Civil War: Peninsula Campaign; Battle of Antietam; Siege of Knoxville †

William Price Sanders (August 12, 1833 – November 19, 1863) was an officer in the Union Army in the American Civil War who died at the Siege of Knoxville.

== Birth and early years ==
William Sanders was born near Frankfort, Kentucky to wealthy attorney Lewis Sanders (Saunders), Jr., and his wife Margaret Hubbel (Price). Through his mother he was a descendent of John Gano, a Revolutionary War patriot. His family moved circa 1839 to Natchez, Mississippi, where he was raised.

He was a cousin of Jefferson Davis, Confederate General Richard Montgomery Gano, and Confederate Captain William Hubbel Price (the later two through John Gano their great-grandfather), while his sister Elizabeth Jane married attorney, mining magnate and thoroughbred horse breeder James Ben Ali Haggin (December 9, 1822 – September 13, 1914), a business partner of George Hearst and the owner of Elmendorf Farm in Lexington, Kentucky.

The Haggin family lived next door to the Sanders family in Natchez. William Price Sanders went by the nickname "Doc", but he did not have a medical degree. He was purportedly named in honor of his uncle, a physician. NOTE: Presumably Lewis Bennett P. Sanders, M.D.

== Military career ==
Sanders attended the United States Military Academy at West Point from 1852 to 1856, but was not an outstanding cadet, graduating 41st in his class. West Point Superintendent Robert E. Lee wrote a May 1854 letter announcing Sanders' dismissal, but he managed to avoid dismissal with the help of the U.S. Secretary of War Jefferson Davis. Sanders graduated in 1856, and served in the western territories (including Utah). He was commissioned a brevet second lieutenant in the 1st U.S. Dragoons on July 1, 1856. He became second lieutenant in the 2nd U.S. Dragoons on May 27, 1857.

Despite a pre-war reputation for being sympathetic to the South, Sanders remained loyal to the Union. He was promoted to first lieutenant on May 10, 1861. Four days later he was raised to the rank of captain. On August 2, 1861, the 2nd U.S. Dragoons was renamed the 6th U.S. Cavalry, in which he participated in the Peninsula Campaign and the Battle of Antietam. After Antietam, Ambrose Burnside gave him a command in the Department of the Ohio, resulting in his transfer to Cincinnati, Ohio. On March 4, 1863, Sanders was appointed colonel of the 5th Kentucky Cavalry Regiment.

Sanders was appointed chief of cavalry of the District of Central Kentucky, Department of the Ohio on April 16, 1863. Burnside then decided to have Sanders lead a raid into East Tennessee, where he was to scout out the enemy, as well as disrupt communication and transportation networks. He also pursued Morgan's Raiders in July 1863.

Sanders was appointed chief of the cavalry corps of the Department of the Ohio in September 1863. Sanders next moved with his forces to Knoxville, where he arrived September 3, 1863. Sanders was appointed brigadier general on October 18, 1863, but this appointment did not become official because he was never confirmed by the United States Senate. Sanders commanded a brigade of the XXIII Corps and then the 1st Division of the cavalry corps of the Army of the Ohio from November 3, 1863, to November 18, 1863, in the Knoxville Campaign.

On November 18, 1863, Sanders was shot in the side and mortally wounded by a sharpshooter of the forces under the command of Confederate Col. Edward Porter Alexander, his old roommate and classmate at West Point. Sanders was fighting to stop Confederate movement on the Kingston Road about 1 mile (1.6 km) in front of the Knoxville defenses. The sharpshooter is believed to have been in the tower of Bleak House. Sanders was taken to the Lamar House. He died the next day in the bridal suite.

Sanders was initially buried in the cemetery of Second Presbyterian Church under cover of darkness, but his remains were later moved to the Chattanooga National Cemetery. He was a bachelor at the time of his death but was dating Sue Boyd, a Knoxville relative of Confederate spy Belle Boyd. Miss Boyd is not believed to have betrayed him and is reported to have mourned his death.

The Battle of Fort Sanders, part of the Knoxville Campaign, occurred approximately ten days after his death.

== Namesakes and honors ==
The Union fortification "Fort Loudon" was renamed "Fort Sanders" in his memory. Knoxville's Fort Sanders neighborhood and Fort Sanders Presbyterian Hospital, both of which are located on the site of the fort, are also named after him. In addition, the Sons of Union Veterans has a chapter in East Tennessee named in memory of "Colonel William P. Sanders". A historical marker on Kingston Pike denotes the location where he was mortally wounded. Ironically, the marker is on the property of Second Presbyterian Church, which relocated from downtown Knoxville to the place where William Sanders was hit.

== See also ==
- List of American Civil War generals (Union)
