= Richard Montgomery Gano =

Confederate general of the American Civil War (1830–1913)

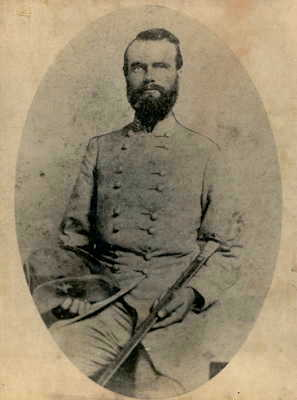
- Born: June 17, 1830; Bourbon County, Kentucky, U.S.
- Died: March 17, 1913 (aged 82); Dallas, Texas, U.S.
- Burial place: Oakland Cemetery, Dallas, Texas
- Military career
- Allegiance: Confederate States of America
- Branch: Confederate States Army
- Service years: 1861–1865
- Rank: Brigadier General
- Conflicts: American Civil War

Richard Montgomery Gano (June 17, 1830 – March 27, 1913) was a Confederate general during the American Civil War, physician, and politician.

== Early life ==
Richard Gano was born June 17, 1830, near Springdale in Bourbon County, Kentucky, the son of John Allen Gano, "The Apollos Of The West", who was the son of Gen. Richard M. Gano, veteran of the War of 1812. John Allen Gano was a minister in the Disciples of Christ and was active in the Restoration Movement with Alexander Campbell and Barton W. Stone. The first General Richard Gano was the son of Rev. John Gano and Sarah Stites. (His great-grandfather Rev. John Gano was the first pastor of the First Baptist Church of New York City and was known as the "Fighting Chaplain" for his Revolutionary War exploits. He is also credited with having baptized George Washington in the Potomac River although this is disputed.) Gano was of Huguenot descent. Through John Gano he was a cousin of Union General William Price Sanders and Texas State Legislator William Hubbel Price.

Richard was baptized into the church at age ten, and at twelve he entered Bacon College in Harrodsburg, Kentucky (Bacon was the progenitor of the University of Kentucky). He completed his course of studies at Bethany College in Bethany, Virginia (now West Virginia) about 1847, and then attended Louisville Medical Institute in Louisville, Kentucky, from which he graduated in 1849.

Gano practiced medicine first in Kentucky, then in Baton Rouge, Louisiana (including two years as physician to the Louisiana State Prison), until 1858. He married Martha ("Mattie") Jones Welch of Crab Orchard, Kentucky, March 15, 1853, in Garrard County, Kentucky, and they had twelve children, nine of whom lived to adulthood. Martha was born October 8, 1832, and died September 22, 1895, in Dallas, Texas. Allene Stone Gano, mother of aviation billionaire Howard Hughes, was General Gano's granddaughter.

In 1859, Gano moved his family to Grapevine Prairie, Texas, in northeast Tarrant County (roughly on the present site of the Dallas/Fort Worth International Airport), and began farming and stockraising, as well as continuing to practice medicine. He was particularly interested in introducing Kentucky race horse breeds to Texas. He was soon involved in community efforts to pursue Comanche raiding parties, and was presented a sword for his efforts by local citizens. In 1860, he was elected to the Texas legislature from Tarrant County, where he was active in debates on frontier defense and agricultural issues.

== Civil War ==
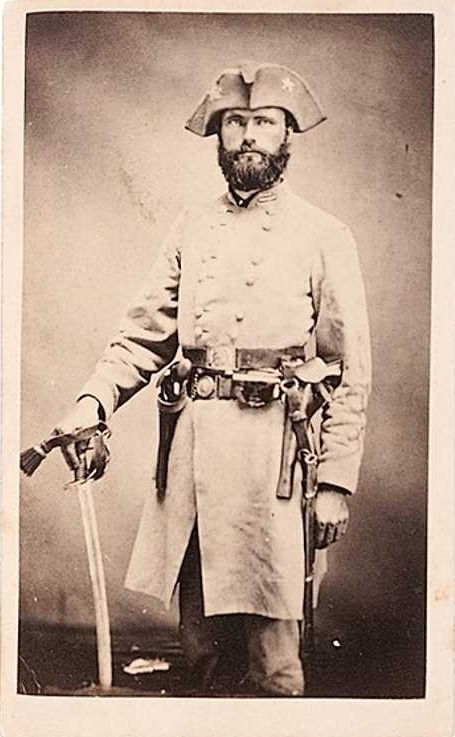
Gano in the Civil War

He resigned his seat early in 1861 to enter Confederate service and on June 1 was elected captain of the "Grapevine Volunteers", a company of mounted riflemen he had raised. He soon expanded it into two companies. General Albert Sidney Johnston, a friend from Texas, requested Gano's command (known as Gano's Texas Cavalry Battalion) be transferred to his army for use as scouts. By the time it arrived in Mississippi, however, the bloody engagement at Shiloh was over and Johnston was declare K.I.A. By early March 1862, he had reorganized his unit into a partial cavalry squadron of two companies, which was mustered into direct Confederate service and was assigned to Col. John Hunt Morgan's 2nd Kentucky Cavalry at Chattanooga, Tennessee by PGT Beauregard. Capt. Gano, commanding Company G, took part in Morgan's first Kentucky raid in July 1862 as well as Morgan's raid on the Louisville & Nashville Railroad in August. During the latter campaign, he was promoted to major in command of a full cavalry squadron (his original two companies plus a third company raised in Tennessee), which he led at the Battle of Gallatin.

In September 1862, Gano's squadron became the nucleus of the new 7th Kentucky Cavalry Regiment and he was promoted to colonel in Gen. Morgan's new cavalry brigade. The regiment took part in all the actions of Gen. Edmund Kirby Smith's invasion of Kentucky in the fall of 1862, culminating in the Battle of Perryville on October 8, the Battle of Lexington on October 17, and the retreat into east Tennessee. The 7th Kentucky Cavalry subsequently took part in Morgan's second Kentucky raid, December 1862 to January 1863, and by February Gano (though still a colonel) was in command of the First Cavalry Brigade of Gen. Morgan's cavalry division. On April 3, the brigade was attacked at Snows Hill, Tennessee, by some 8,000 Union infantry and cavalry and was forced to withdraw to McMinnville. Shortly after this, Morgan's forces were essentially destroyed during Morgan's Raid, and the remnants rejoined Gano's depleted brigade. On September 18, 1863, Col. Gano commanded both his own brigade and Morgan's survivors under Gen. Nathan Bedford Forrest at the Battle of Chickamauga.

Gano left active service for a period because of illness, then was promoted to brigadier general (though he did not receive his "official" promotion until March 17, 1865) and took the eighty-odd survivors of his original Texas cavalry unit (now called the "Gano Guards") back to Bonham, Texas. There he assumed command, October 10, 1863, of all Texas cavalry operating in the Trans-Mississippi Department. On December 27, Gano's brigade captured and occupied Waldron, Arkansas, and in April 1864 he suffered an arm wound at a skirmish at Moscow, Arkansas. Two months later, he commanded the attack on Fort Smith, Arkansas, and on July 27, 1864, he led an attack on the 6th Kansas Cavalry at the Battle of Massard Prairie.

A few weeks later, Gano's brigade, with accompanying artillery, moved to Indian Territory and on September 19 he commanded both the Fifth Texas Cavalry Brigade (made up of the 29th, 30th, and 31st Texas Cavalry and the 11th Field Battery (Howell's Company, Light Artillery) and Brig. Gen. Stand Watie's Indian cavalry (consisting of Cherokee, Creek, and Seminole) at the second Battle of Cabin Creek. His commission reportedly predated Stand Watie's by one month, putting him in command by seniority. In this action, the general was wounded again but Confederate forces totaling about 2,000 captured a federal supply train of some three hundred wagons and 750 mules, valued at more than two million dollars. In a congratulatory telegram, Gen. Kirby Smith called this "one of the most brilliant raids of the entire war".

In January 1865, as part of a last reorganization of troops west of the Mississippi by Kirby Smith, the brigade was ordered to Nacogdoches, but on May 26, the Army of the Trans-Mississippi surrendered to federal forces. Gano had been recommended for promotion to major general but the war ended before this could be acted upon.

== Postwar career ==
In 1866, Gano returned to Kentucky, where he was ordained a minister in the Disciples of Christ by his father and by Winthrop Hobson of the Old Union Church. By 1870, he had taken up residence in Dallas, where he resumed stockraising and preached regularly. Over the next thirty years, he was instrumental in establishing a number of churches, both in north Texas and in Kentucky, and was active in the Prohibition movement of the 1880s. Western Heights Church of Christ, South MaCarthur Church of Christ and Highland Oaks Church of Christ, are some of the historic churches that trace their beginnings to Gano's work.

As a stockman in the later 19th century, Gano imported a number of important bloodlines into Texas, including cattle, horses, sheep, and hogs. He also was a general businessman, forming a real estate company with two of his sons, and serving as a director of the Bankers and Merchants National Bank in Dallas. These involvements led to his becoming a millionaire. He also was active in United Confederate Veterans.

With his sons, John T. Gano and Clarence M. Gano, he formed the Estado Land and Cattle Company, where he served as vice president. The company established the G4 Ranch in the Big Bend region of Texas in late 1880s and early 1890s. The G4 was one of the largest in the Trans-Pecos in that period. The G4 Ranch comprised 55,000 acres in survey Block G4 (hence the name of the ranch) and leased other watered sections nearby. Ranch headquarters were at Oak Spring or Ojo de Chisos, just west of the basin in what is now Big Bend National Park. The ranch extended from Agua Fria Mountain on the north to the Rio Grande on the south, and from Terlingua Creek on the west to the Chisos Mountains on the east; it thus covered most of what is now southwestern Brewster County, Texas. The Ganos persuaded James B. Gillett to resign as marshal of El Paso to manage the ranch. This was land that had never been stocked; at the time, recalled Gillett, "The Ganos had it all to themselves."

Richard Gano died March 27, 1913, at the home of his daughter Mrs. Emma Scurry, 1903 Bennett Ave in Dallas and is buried in Oakland Cemetery.

In 1974, the "dog-trot" house he purchased at Grapevine Prairie in 1857 was moved to Dallas Heritage Village, which is located on Gano Street, named for Richard Gano. The house was originally built of logs and was later covered with white clapboard siding.

He had many descendants, the most famous of whom was billionaire Howard Hughes.

Gen. Richard M. Gano Chapter #2433 of the United Daughters of the Confederacy, Texas Division, meets in Irving, Texas.

Brig. Gen. Richard M. Gano Camp #2292 of the Sons of Confederate Veterans, Texas Division, meets in Grapevine, Texas.

Gano's papers (which include the papers of John Allen Gano) are housed in the archives of the ACU Brown Library on the campus of Abilene Christian University in Abilene, TX.

== See also ==
- List of American Civil War generals (Confederate)
