= Peter Mawney =

- Born: 1689; East Greenwich, Rhode Island
- Died: 9 September 1754 (aged 64–65); Providence, Rhode Island
- Resting place: North Burial Ground, Providence
- Occupations: Colonel, Providence County Militia
- Spouse(s): (1) Mary Tillinghast (2) Mercy Tillinghast
- Children: Elizabeth, John, Lydia, Mercy, Mary, Pardon, Sarah, Amey
- Parent: Moses LeMoine

Peter Mawney (c. 1689 – 1754) was a member of one of the few French Huguenot families that remained in Rhode Island, following violent clashes with the English citizens of East Greenwich, Rhode Island over disputed land. Mawney spent 24 years in the military service of the colony, serving in both the East Greenwich and Providence militias, and retiring as a colonel in the Providence County 2nd Regiment. He also served for many years as justice of the Peace for the town of East Greenwich.

Mawney was married twice, both times to daughters of Pardon Tillinghast, Jr., and had eight children. His son, John Mawney, was Sheriff of Providence for several years, and his grandson, John Mawney, Jr., was a surgeon and one of the raiders that attacked and burned the British revenue ship Gaspee during the leadup to the American Revolutionary War.

== Life ==
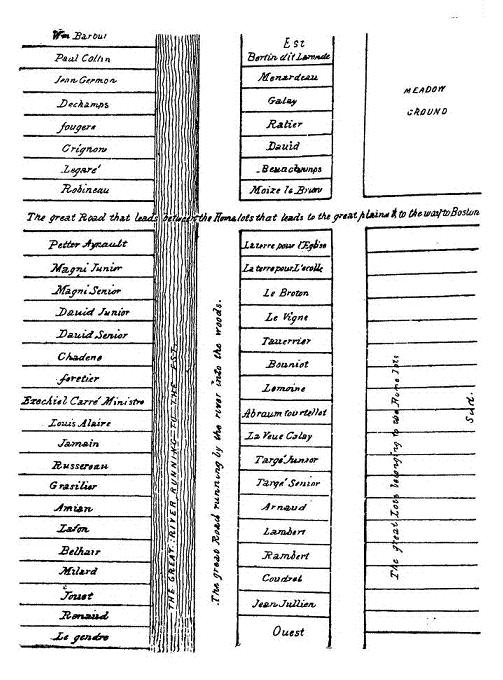
Original plat map of Frenchtown

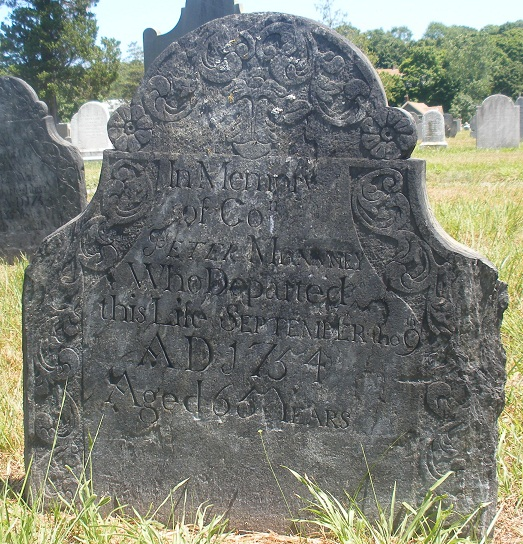
Grave marker for Copllonel Mawney, North Burial Ground, Providence

Born in 1689 in East Greenwich, Rhode Island, Peter Mawplney was a son of one of the original Huguenot settlers of Frenchtown, located along the southern boundary of East Greenwich. His father signed the initial agreement for the incorporation of the settlement in 1686, and his name appears on the plat map, but only the surname of LeMoine is given in both cases. By family tradition, his father's given name was Moses, a name which appears in later generations within the family. The name LeMoine was anglicized to "Money," and then to Mawney, which was the spelling maintained by later generations.

The original French immigrants had settled around a spring and planted an orchard there, and following violent clashes with the English citizens of the area, and the subsequent departure of most of the French, the Mawneys were one of only two families that remained on their original land, the Targe' (Tourgee) family being the other. The Mawney property included the spring and French orchard.

Mawney spent 24 years in the military service of the colony, and began his service in 1722 as an Ensign in the East Greenwich branch of the colonial militia. By 1728 he held the rank of lieutenant and in 1730 became a captain, which rank he last held in 1735. In May 1735 he resigned as Captain of the East Greenwich company, becoming a major in the Providence County militia. By 1738 he was lieutenant colonel of the Second Regiment of the Providence County Militia, but the following year he was made colonel of the same regiment, and maintained this rank until retiring from service in 1746, at the age of 57.

In addition to his military service, Mawney served as a justice of the peace for East Greenwich from 1733 to 1747. He kept his ample East Greenwich property until his death, and was called "of East Greenwich" as late as 1752 in the marriage record of his daughter Mary, but may have moved to Providence in the last year or two of his life, where his will is recorded. He died in Providence on 9 September 1754, and was buried in the North Burial Ground, near where his son John was buried only a few months earlier. His first wife is buried in a Tillinghast family cemetery near Mawney's East Greenwich property. Following his death, his widow married James Brown of Norwich, Connecticut, but upon her death, she was buried by her former husband in the North Burial Ground.

== Family ==
Mawney married twice, the first time to Mary Tillinghast, the daughter of Pardon Tillinghast, Jr., and granddaughter of Reverend Pardon Tillinghast who had come from Seven Cliffs, in Sussex, England. Mary died as a young woman, after which Mawney married her sister, Mercy. Mawney had five children with his first wife, and three more with his second wife. His oldest daughter, Mercy, married first Captain George Thomas, and second Joseph Olney, a great grandson of early Providence settler Thomas Olney. His oldest son, John Mawney, was the Sheriff of Providence for several years before his early death; he married Amey Gibbs, a daughter of Robert and Amey (Whipple) Gibbs, and a granddaughter of Colonel Joseph Whipple and niece of Deputy Governor Joseph Whipple, Jr. Mawney's daughter Mercy married Thomas Fry, a grandson of colonial Rhode Island Deputy Governor Thomas Frye, and a great grandson of Warwick founders Samuel Gorton and John Greene. His daughter Mary married Brigadier General James Angell, a great grandson of early Providence settler Thomas Angell, and also a great grandson of Rhode Island colonial President Gregory Dexter.

Mawney's grandson, John Mawney, Jr., was a surgeon, a colonel in the Providence Militia, and a member of the party that raided and burned the English revenue ship Gaspee during the lead up to the American Revolutionary War. After the commander of the vessel, Lieutenant Dudingston, was shot, Mawney removed the bullet from him. John Mawney, Jr., and three other Gaspee veterans were honored by the State of Rhode Island 50 years after the burning of the vessel.

== See also ==
- List of early settlers of Rhode Island
- Colony of Rhode Island and Providence Plantations
