= First Baptist Church in America =

Church in Providence, Rhode Island, US

- First Baptist Meetinghouse
- U.S. National Register of Historic Places
- U.S. National Historic Landmark
- U.S. National Historic Landmark District – Contributing property
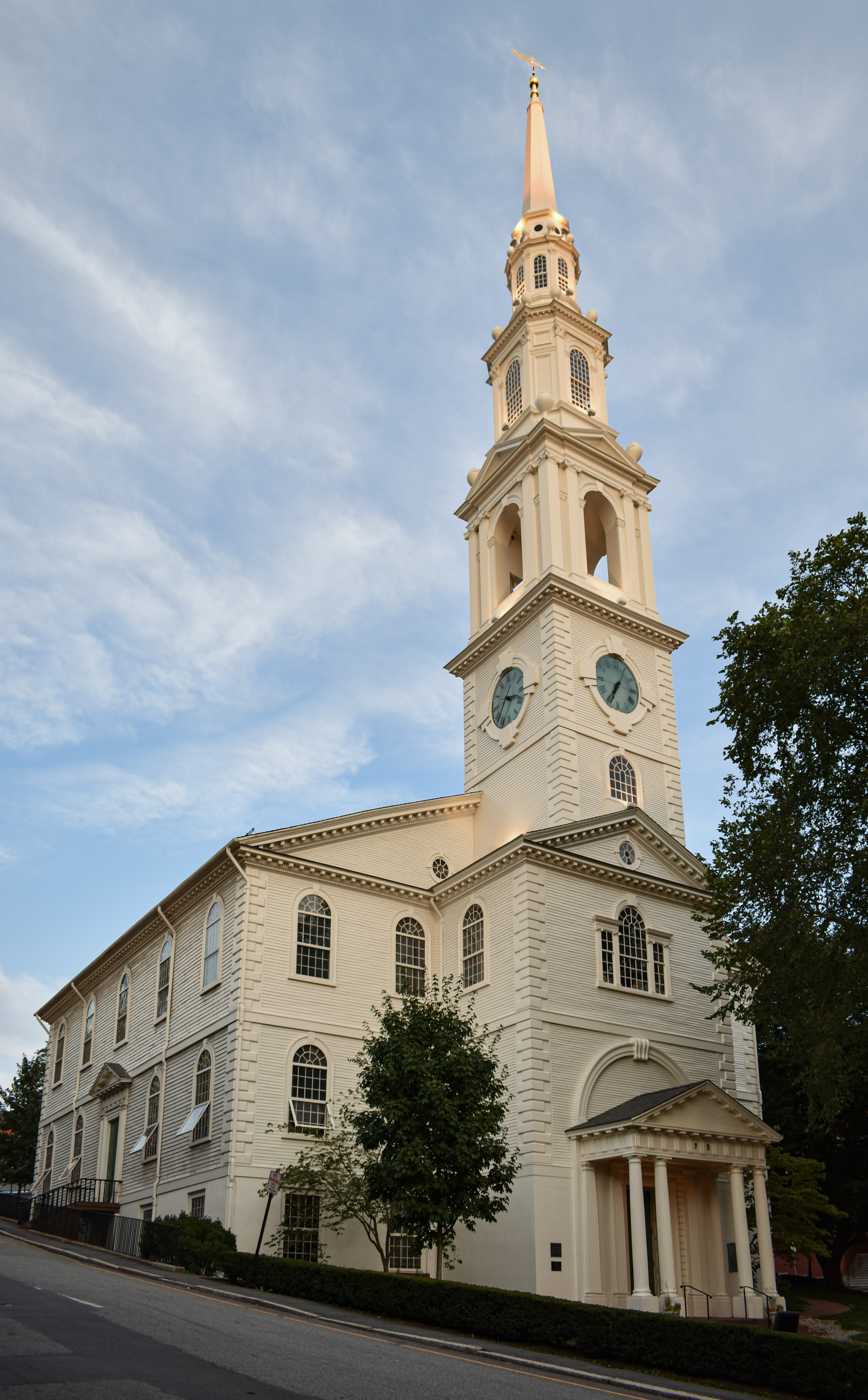
- Front elevation, 2020

- Location within Rhode Island Location within the United States
- Location: Providence, RI
- Coordinates: 41°49′38″N 71°24′29″W
- Built: 1775
- Architect: Joseph Brown; Multiple
- Architectural style: Georgian
- Part of: College Hill Historic District (ID70000019)
- NRHP reference No.: 66000017

Significant dates
- Added to NRHP: October 15, 1966
- Designated NHL: October 9, 1960
- Designated NHLDCP: November 10, 1970

The First Baptist Church in America, also known as the First Baptist Church of Providence or the First Baptist Meetinghouse, is the oldest church in Rhode Island and the oldest Baptist church in the United States and the Americas. The church was established in 1638 by Roger Williams in Providence, Rhode Island. The present church building was erected between 1774 and 1775 and held its first meetings in May 1775. It is located at 75 North Main Street in Providence's College Hill neighborhood. It was designated a National Historic Landmark in 1960. It is affiliated with the American Baptist Churches USA.

== History ==
Roger Williams had been holding religious services in his residence for nearly a year before he converted his church into a Baptist church in 1638. This followed his founding of Providence in 1636. For the next sixty years, the congregation met in residences, or outdoors in pleasant weather. Eventually, they came to see the utility of a worship place, and so they erected plain, Puritan-style meetinghouses.

Roger Williams was a Calvinist, but within a few years of its founding, the congregation became more Arminian, and was clearly a General Six-Principle Baptist church by 1652. It remained a General Baptist church until it migrated back to a variety of Calvinism under the leadership of James Manning in the 1770s. Following Williams as pastor of the church was Chad Brown, founder of the famous Brown family of Rhode Island. A number of the streets in Providence bear the names of pastors of First Baptist Church, including Williams, Brown, Gregory Dexter, Thomas Olney, William Wickenden, Manning, and Stephen Gano. In 1700, Pardon Tillinghast built the first church building, a 400-square-foot (37 m^{2}) structure, near the corner of Smith and North Main Streets. In 1711 he donated the building and land to the church in a deed describing the church as General Six-Principle Baptist in theology. In 1736 the congregation built its second meetinghouse on an adjoining lot at the corner of Smith and North Main Streets. This building was about 40 × 40 feet square (i.e.1,600-square-foot (150 m^{2})).

When it was built in 1774–75, the current church building represented a dramatic departure from the traditional Puritan Baptist meetinghouse style. It was the first Baptist church to have a steeple and bell, making it more like an established parish church. The builders were part of a movement among Baptists in the urban centers of Boston, Newport, New York, and Philadelphia to bring respectability and recognition to American Baptists.

=== Association with Brown University ===
Central to the movement for greater recognition and growth was the creation of an educated ministry and the founding of a college. The Philadelphia Baptist Association sent Dr. James Manning to Rhode Island to establish the college in the colony of Rhode Island and Providence Plantations (later renamed Brown University) in 1764. Beginning in Warren, the college then relocated to Providence in 1770. The college president, Manning, was also called to be the pastor of the Providence church in 1771. During his ministry the present church building was erected "for the publick worship of Almighty God and also for holding commencement in." Subsequent Brown presidents Jonathan Maxcy and Francis Wayland also served as ministers at the church.

The Brown family that soon gave its name to the university were prominent members of the church, and descendants of its founders and those of the Rhode Island Colony (the second pastor of the congregation after Roger Williams was Chad Brown). Although the university is now secular, in honor of its history and tradition, the meetinghouse continues to be used, as it has been since 1776, as the site of Brown University's undergraduate commencement.

=== Construction, alterations and designations ===
Construction of the church began in the summer of 1774; at the time, the project was the largest building project ever attempted in New England. Due to the closure of the Massachusetts ports by the British as punishment for the Boston Tea Party, out-of-work ship builders and carpenters came to Providence to work on the meetinghouse. The main portion of the meetinghouse was dedicated in mid-May 1775, and the steeple erected in three and a half days in the first week of June.

Notable additions to the meetinghouse have included a Waterford crystal chandelier given by Hope Brown Ives (1792), a large pipe organ given by her brother Nicholas Brown Jr., the younger (1834); the addition of rooms for Sunday school, a fellowship hall, and offices on the lower level (1819–1859), and an addition to the east end of the meetinghouse to accommodate an indoor baptistery (1884). The 1884 addition included a large stained glass window that was soon deemed inappropriate and shuttered over.

In 1957, John D. Rockefeller Jr. funded a restoration effort that removed Victorian additions to the building, returning much of the church's interior to its original appearance.

Notably absent from the interior is a gallery originally constructed on the church's western side for use by slaves and free black residents of Providence.

The building was designated as a National Historic Landmark in 1960, and listed on the National Register of Historic Places in 1966.

== Architecture ==
The building was designed by astronomer and amateur architect Joseph Brown. Brown's design borrowed significantly from the designs English architect James Gibbs published in his 1728 Book of Architecture. The church's steeple, for example, is an exact execution of one of three unbuilt designs for the spire of St Martin-in-the-Fields.

== Today ==
In addition to weekly worship services, the Meeting House hosts concerts, talks, and lectures by world-renowned artists, performers, academics, and elected officials. Brown University holds commencement services of its undergraduate college at the meetinghouse.

In 2001, history professor J. Stanley Lemons wrote a history of the church, entitled First: The History of the First Baptist Church in America.

== Affiliations ==
The First Baptist Church in America is affiliated with the American Baptist Churches of Rhode Island (ABCORI) and the American Baptist Churches USA (ABCUSA). The church actively supports the Rhode Island State Council of Churches, the National Council of Churches, the Baptist World Alliance, and the Baptist Joint Committee for Religious Liberty. Many members have served in various denominational, academic, and divinity school positions, including the presidency of Brown University.

== Gallery ==
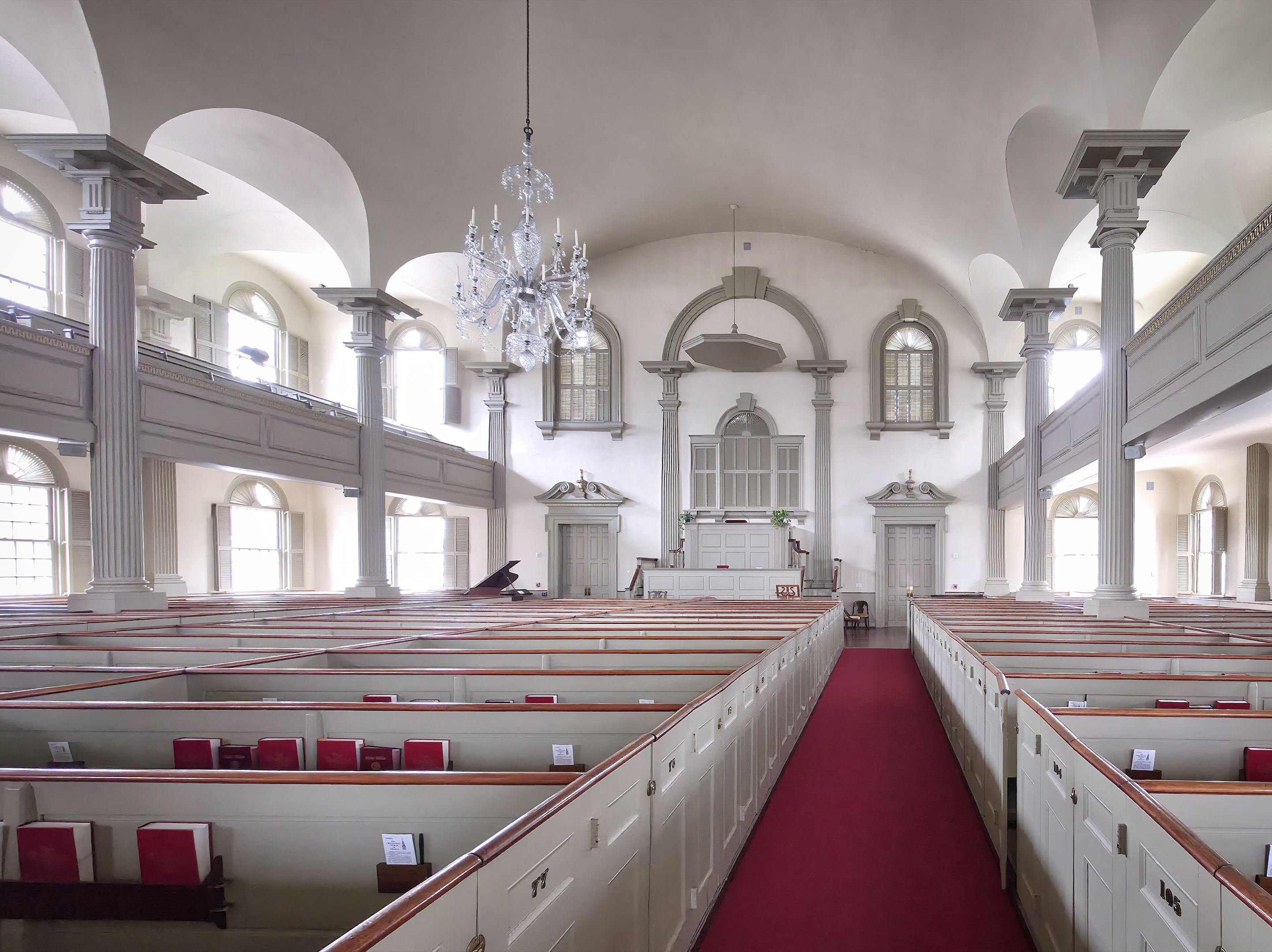
Interior aisle

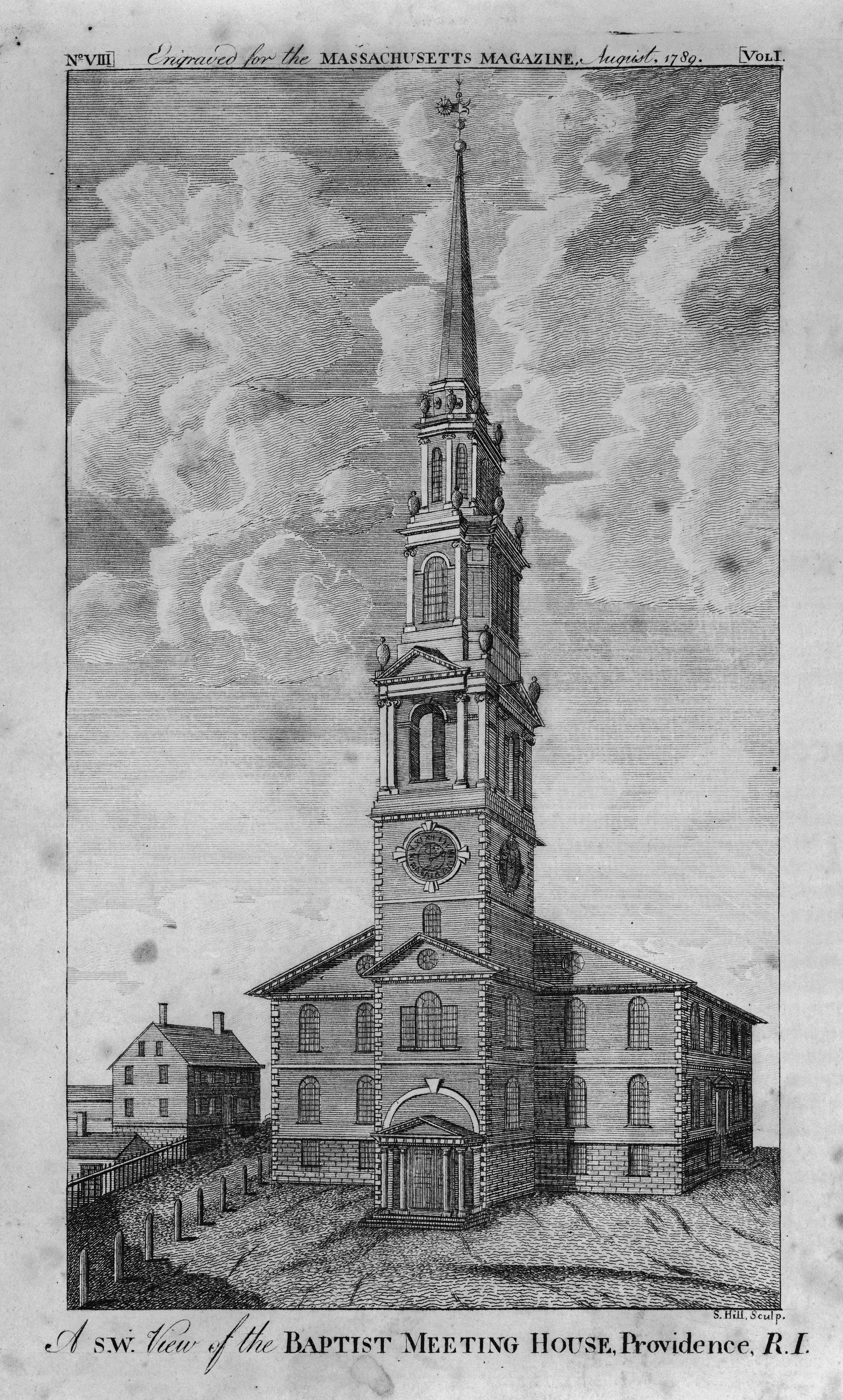
This 1789 engraving of the church was the first published image of Providence.

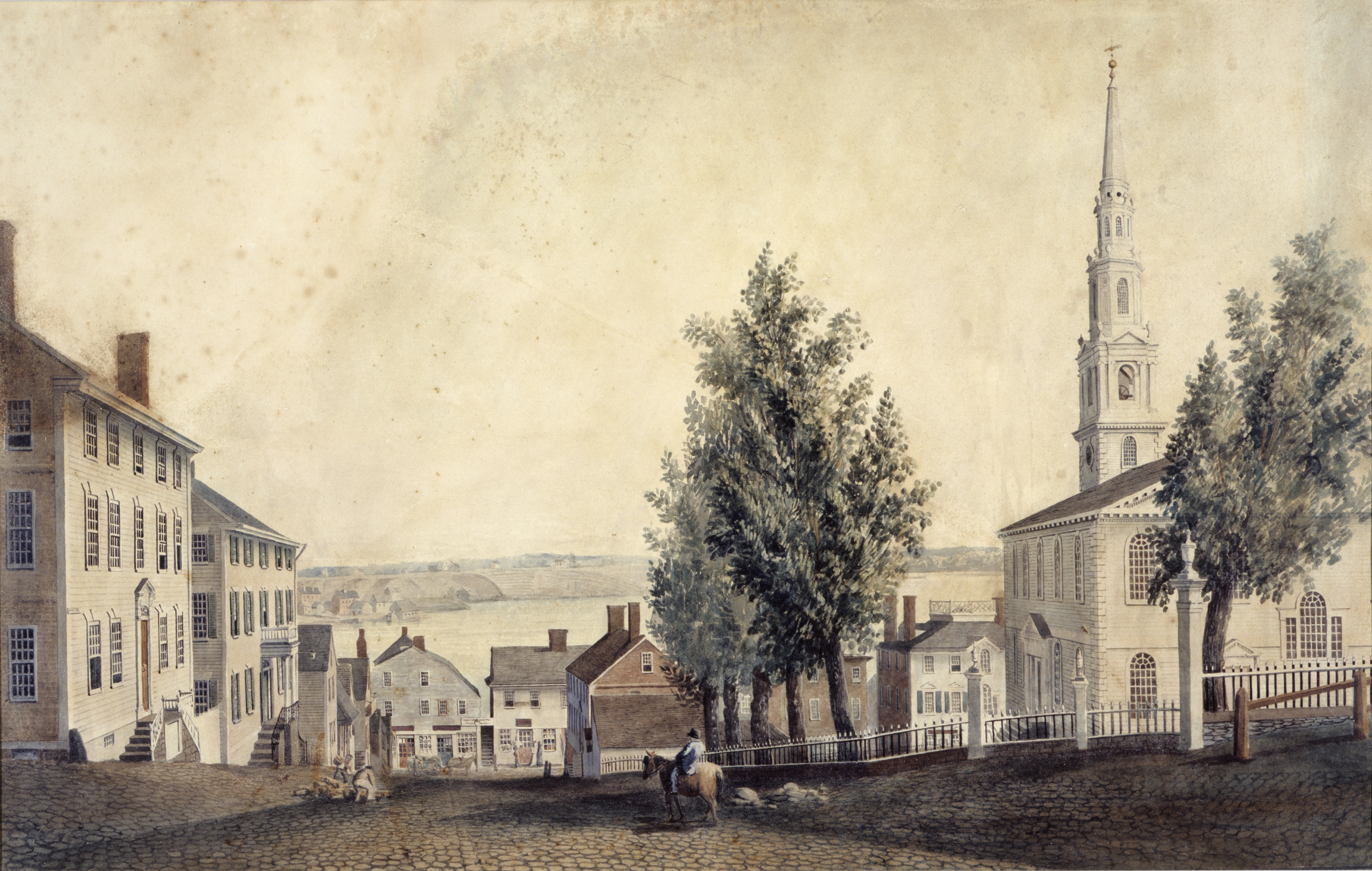
This 1822 painting depicts the church and surrounding buildings.

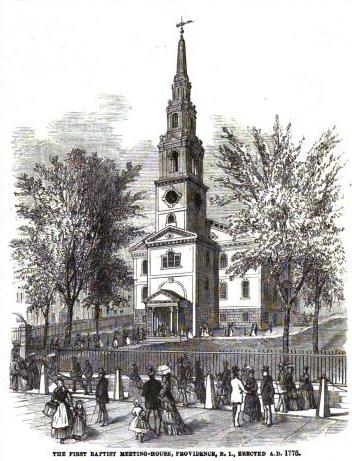
Frank Leslie's Illustrated Sunday magazine, 1877

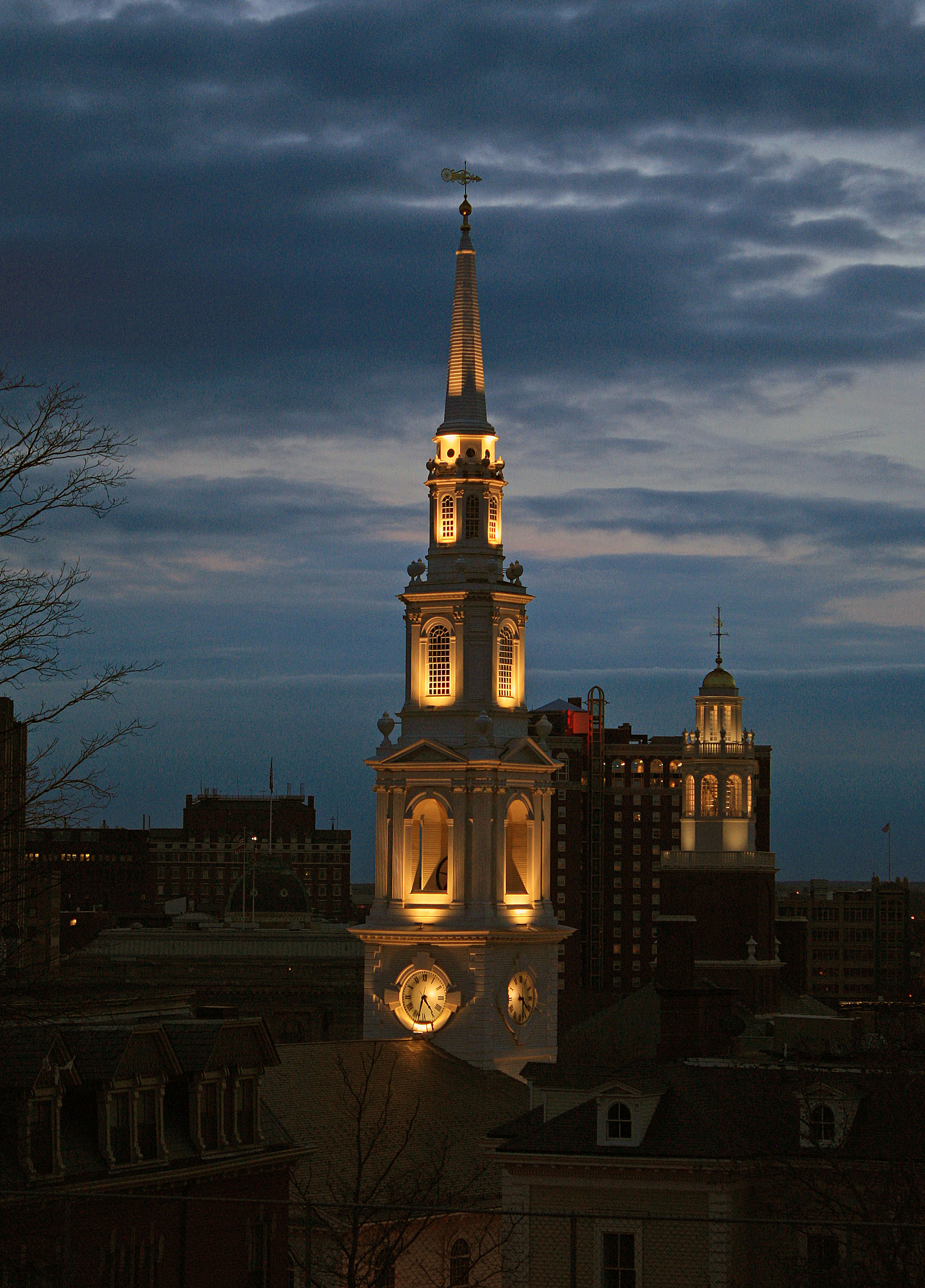
An evening view of the building's illuminated steeple

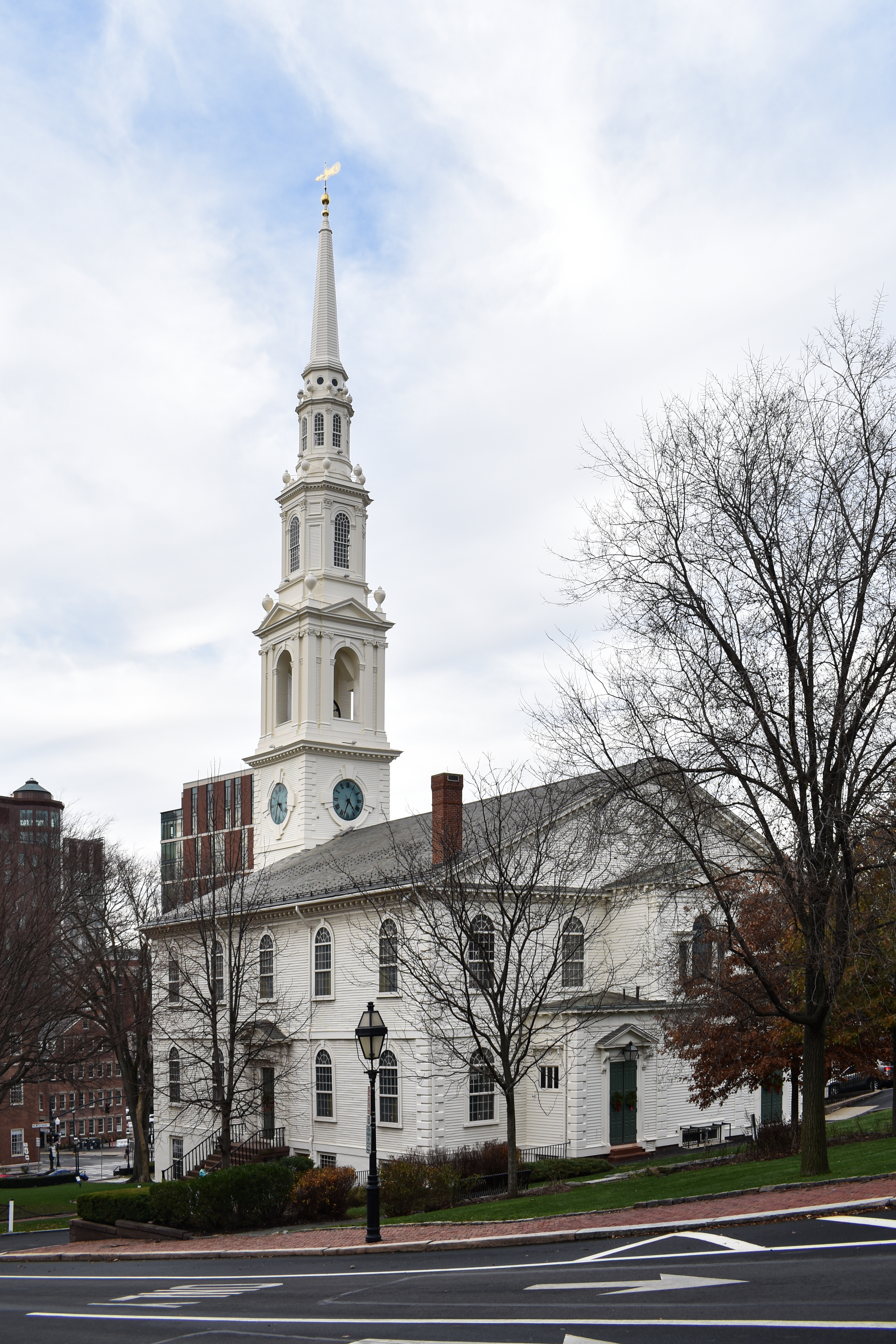
The church from the rear

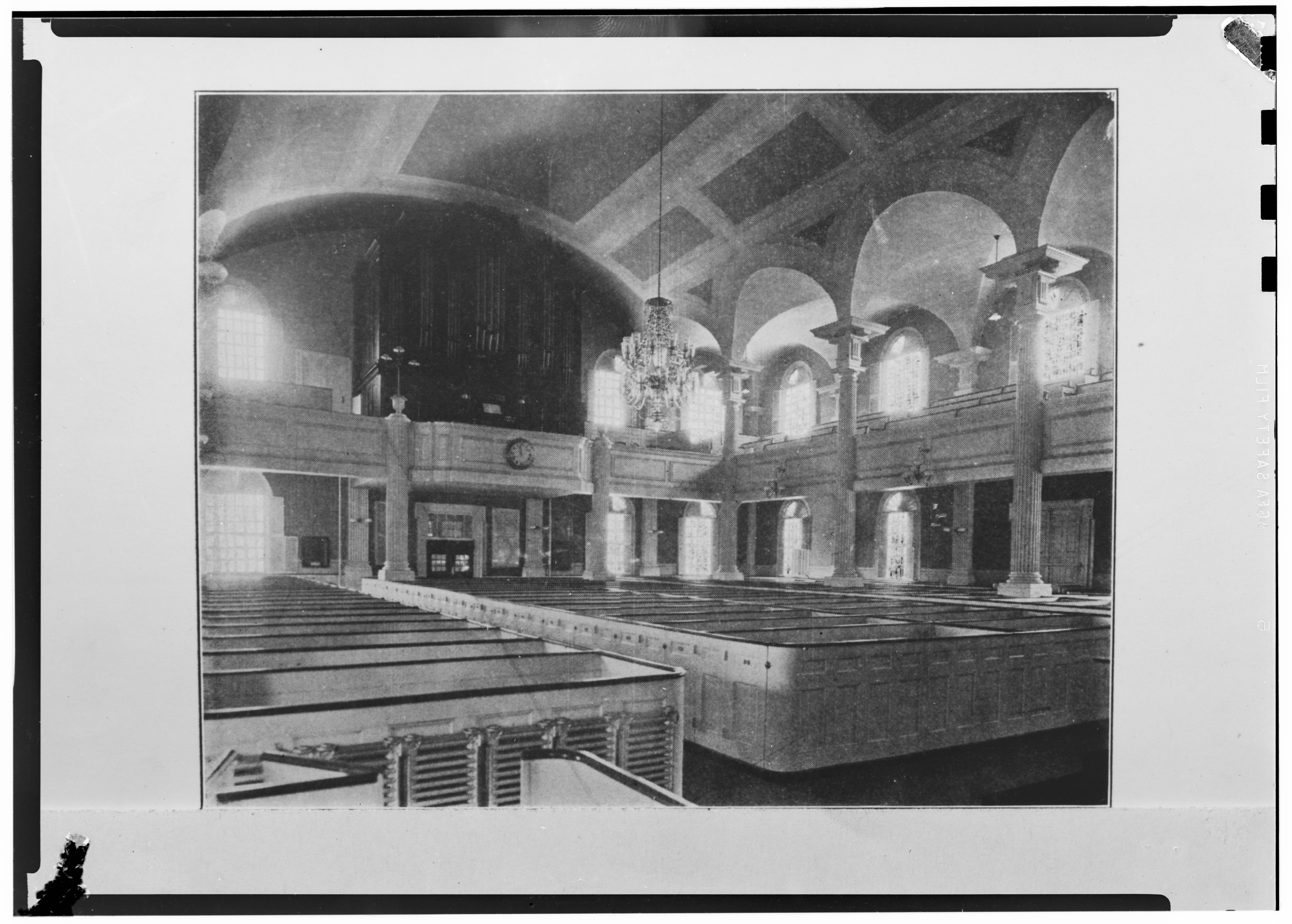
The building's interior

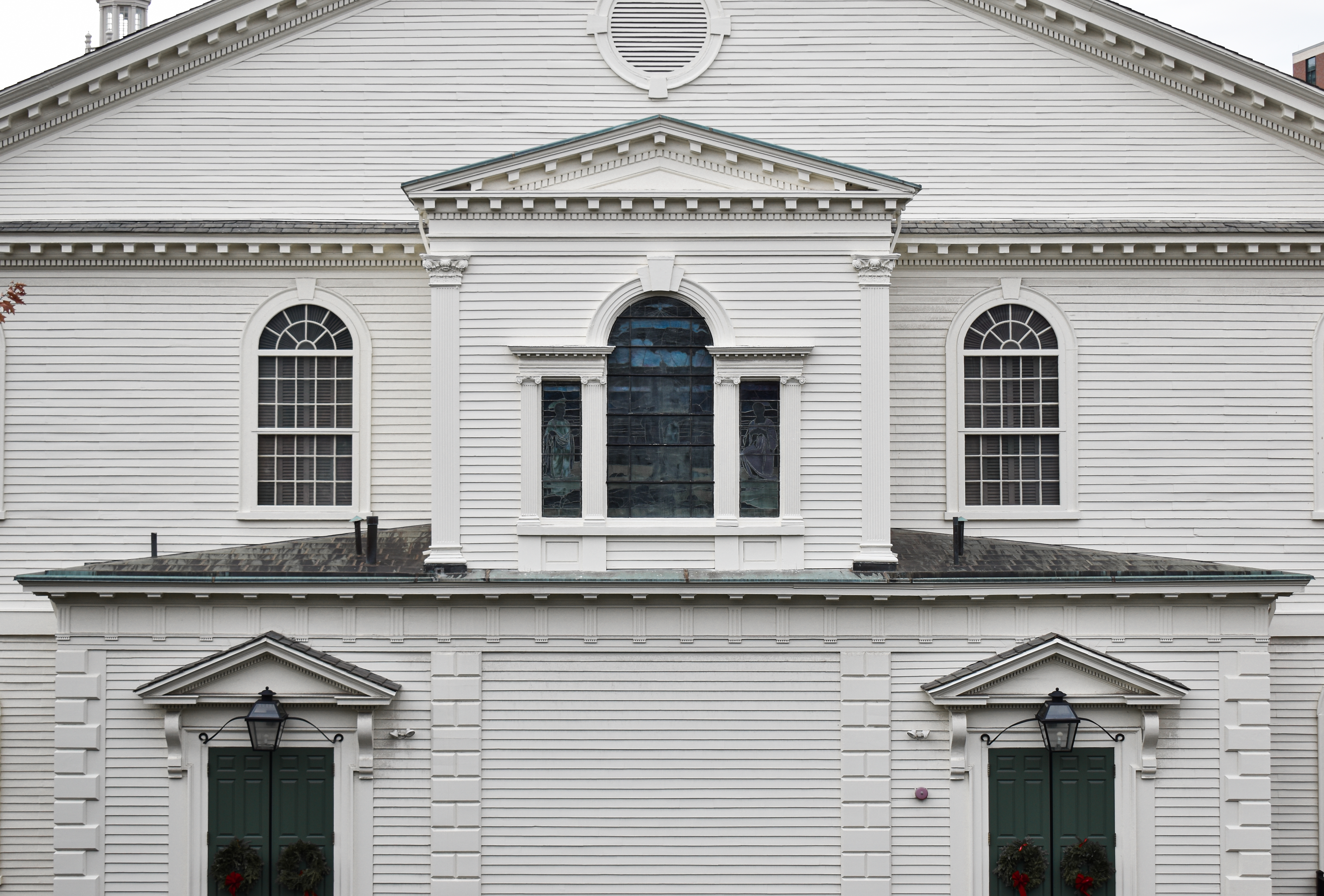
The building's rear showing the 1884 addition

== Settled ministers (sometimes simultaneous pastorships) ==
- Roger Williams, 1638–39
- Chad Brown, 1639 – before 1650
- Thomas Olney, 1639–1652
- William Wickenden, 1642–1670
- Gregory Dexter, 1654–1700
- Pardon Tillinghast, 1681–1718
- Ebenezer Jenckes 1719–1726
- James Colvin 1725–1755
- James Brown 1726–1732
- Samuel Winsor, 1733–1758
- Thomas Burlingame 1733–1764
- Samuel Winsor Jr, 1759–1771
- James Manning, 1771–1791
- John Stanford, 1788–1789
- Jonathan Maxcy, 1791–1792
- Stephen Gano MD, 1792–1828
- Robert Pattison, 1830–36
- William Hague, 1837–40
- Robert Pattison, 1840–1842
- James Granger, 1842–1857
- Francis Wayland, 1857–1858
- Samuel Caldwell, 1858–1873
- Edward G. Taylor, 1875–1881
- Thomas Edwin Brown, 1882–1890
- Henry Melville King, 1891–1906
- Elijah Abraham Hanley, 1907–1911
- John F. Vichert, 1912–1916
- Albert B. Cohoe, 1916–1920
- Arthur W. Cleaves, 1922–1940
- Albert C. Thomas, 1941–1954
- Homer L. Trickett, 1955–1970
- Robert G. Withers, 1971–1975
- Richard D. Bausman, 1976–1982
- Orland L. Tibbetts, 1983–1986
- Dwight M. Lundgren, 1983–1996
- Kate Harvey Penfield, 1987–1995
- Clifford R. Hockensmith, 1997–1999
- James C. Miller, 2000–2005
- Dan Ivins, 2006–2014
- Jamie P. Washam, 2015–

== See also ==
- List of tallest buildings in Providence, Rhode Island
- Oldest churches in the United States
- List of National Historic Landmarks in Rhode Island
- National Register of Historic Places listings in Providence, Rhode Island
