= Old Baptist Parsonage (Scotch Plains, New Jersey) =

- U.S. National Register of Historic Places
- New Jersey Register of Historic Places
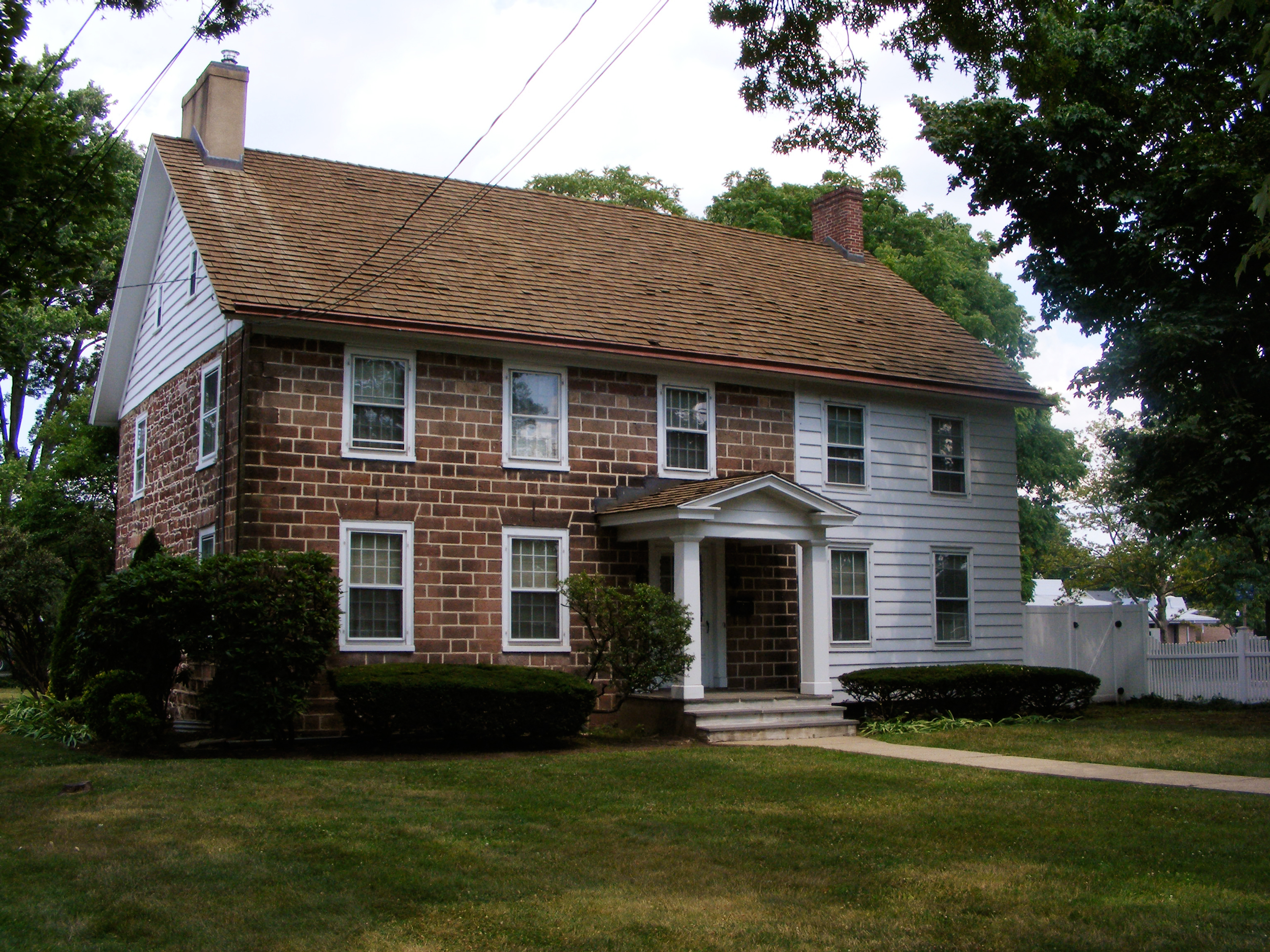

- Location within Union County, New Jersey Location within New Jersey Location within the United States
- Location: 347 Park Avenue, Scotch Plains, New Jersey
- Coordinates: 40°39′6″N 74°23′59″W
- Built: 1786
- NRHP reference No.: 73001137
- NJRHP No.: 2721

Significant dates
- Added to NRHP: January 18, 1973
- Designated NJRHP: May 12, 1972

Old Baptist Parsonage is a historic church parsonage at 547 Park Avenue in the township of Scotch Plains in Union County, New Jersey, United States. It is associated with the historic Scotch Plains Baptist Church and cemetery. The parsonage was added to the National Register of Historic Places on January 18, 1973, for its significance in architecture. In 2013, it was included in the Scotch Plains Baptist Church, Parsonage, and Cemetery listing on the NRHP.

== History and description ==
It still stands on the original site where it was built in 1786. This structure was the first stone parsonage of Essex County, which included what is now Union County. The wood frame addition was added in 1810.

== See also ==
- National Register of Historic Places listings in Union County, New Jersey
