= General Six-Principle Baptists =

American Baptist Christian denomination since 1652

The General Six-Principle Baptists, shortly Six-Principle Baptists, is a Baptist sub-group in the United States. General Six-Principle Baptists originated from early General Baptists in New England Colonies that held to the Five Points of Arminianism and a strict observance of laying on of hands (Confirmation), having no communion with churches that did not practice it.

== History ==
The General Six-Principle Baptists have origins in colonial Rhode Island, in 1652, when the First Baptist Church of Providence, once led by Roger Williams, split over a doctrinal issue. The occasion was the development within the church of an Arminian majority who strictly held to the Six Principles of Hebrew 6:1–2:

Therefore leaving the principles of the doctrine of Christ, let us go on unto perfection; not laying again the foundation of repentance from dead works, and of faith toward God, of the doctrine of baptisms, and of laying on of hands, and of resurrection of the dead, and of eternal judgment.

Of these 6 principles, the laying-on of hands was the only distinctive to this body, that advocated it as mandatory. This practice, known as Confirmation, was used at baptism and after baptism, as a reception of new members in the Church, signs of full communion and the reception of the gifts of the Holy Spirit. Many Particular Baptist churches also practiced the laying on of hands, but they did not exist as a separate body. Even the Philadelphia Baptist Association (organized in 1707) drafted up a confession of faith in 1742, known as the Philadelphia Confession of Faith, as a revision of the Second London Confession with the addition of an article concerning laying-on of hands. A distinguishing feature of these early General Six-Principle Baptists was that they would not commune with other Baptists who did not observe the laying-on of hands. In 1656, members left the First Baptist Church in Newport, founded by John Clarke, and formed the Second Baptist Church in Newport.

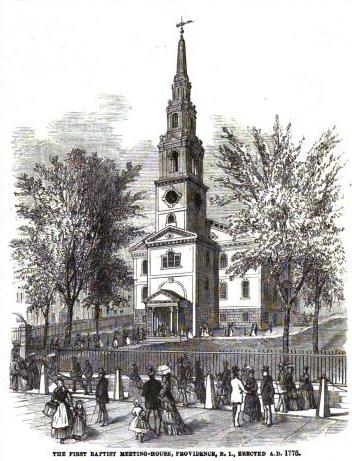
First Baptist Church in America

Churches were planted and conferences rose up in Rhode Island, Massachusetts, New York, and Pennsylvania. The Rhode Island Yearly Meeting was formed in 1670, becoming the first Baptist association in America. It was incorporated in 1895 as the General Six-Principle Baptist Conference of Rhode Island. The word "Hope" and the emblem of the anchor (both taken from Hebrews 6) on the flag and Seal of Rhode Island attest to the historical influence of General Six-Principle Baptists in that state. The New York Yearly Conference was organized around 1824. After 1865, it became known as the General Six-Principle Baptist Association of Pennsylvania.

The General Baptists in England later adopted laying of hands at and after baptism as their practice, as outlined in the Standard Confession of Faith published in 1660. According to Henry Vedder,

In March 1690, the churches holding these views formed an Association. This continued with varying fortunes for some years; at its strongest, numbering but eleven churches in England, though there were others in Wales when the Calvinistic Baptists withdrew, and the rest of the churches were gradually absorbed into the General body.

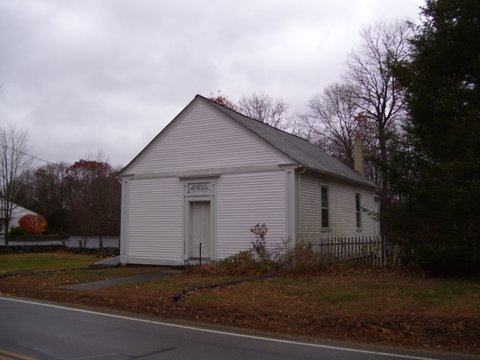
Stony Lane Six Principle Baptist Church in North Kingstown, Rhode Island

In 1954, the Rhode Island Conference lifted their ban on communing with other Christians, preparing the way for their assimilation into the mainstream Baptist tradition. One of the last historical churches to survive is the Stony Lane Six Principle Baptist Church in North Kingstown, Rhode Island. As late as 2009 their pastor, Rev. John Wheeler, wrote "We keep the name only for historical purposes and to our knowledge we are the last church to use it in our official name. We don't include it in our stationery etc., nor do we hold to the specific teaching of highlighting Hebrews 6:1–2 over other parts of Scripture." However, in 2022 they no longer include any mention of "Six Principle" on the church website. According to Albert Wardin, there is also "one church, located in Pennsylvania, which still carries Six Principle in its name, but its current pastor does not observe all the six principles." The Pine Grove Church of Nicholson, Pennsylvania and the Stony Lane Church were the last two churches to be considered historically Six-Principle Baptist.

== Reorganization ==
Saddened by the dissolution of the historic Six-Principle denomination, a small group of Baptist ministers began a reorganization of the movement in 2001. This incorporated reorganization movement was officially renamed on July 10, 2003, as the General Association of Six-Principle Baptist Churches, Inc.; the denomination is based in Alabama. It is also known as the General Association of Six-Principle Baptists which is more descriptive of the fact that the General Association includes not only churches, but individuals, ministers, and ministries.

Since its reorganization, the denomination has grown steadily. All of the ministers credentialed by the General Association serve as Missionaries of the General Association. The General Association of Six-Principle Baptist Churches has no direct historical connection to the original body of Six-Principle Baptists.

== Beliefs ==
The "six-principles" adhered to are those listed in Hebrews 6:1–2:

- Repentance
- Faith
- Baptism
- Laying on of hands
- Resurrection of the dead
- Final judgment
