= William Wickenden =

British colonist in Rhode Island (c. 1614–1671)

Original settlement plots on the East Side of Providence in 1650. Wickenden's strip of farmland (now Wickenden Street) is highlighted

William Wickenden (c. 1614–1671) was an early Anglo-American Baptist minister, co-founder of the Colony of Rhode Island and Providence Plantations, and signer of the Providence Compact. Wickenden Street in Providence marks where he originally settled in the seventeenth century and is named in his honor.

== Emigration to New England ==
Wickenden was possibly born in Oxfordshire, England, in about 1614, although there has been no definitive evidence provided to prove this. Some claim that he was born in Oxford, which has not been proven, either. The Wickenden name originates in Cowden, Kent, and there is an Otford in that county, so some speculate that this is a more logical place to search for his birth.

== Ministry ==
Wickenden emigrated to America prior to 1634 and lived in Salem, Massachusetts, for a time. He followed Roger Williams to Providence Plantation, and he was one of 12 men who signed an agreement in 1637 which is known as the "Providence Compact." He was also one of the 39 signers of an agreement to form a Providence government in 1640.

Wickenden served in the Rhode Island Legislature in 1648, and from 1651 to 1655, and then again in 1664. In 1656, he was arrested by Dutch colonial authorities, along with his host Sheriff William Hallet (husband of Elizabeth Fones). He was jailed and fined for baptizing Christians in Flushing, Queens near New Amsterdam (New York). The Dutch authorities learned that he was a poor cobbler with a large family, and they agreed to exile him rather than imprison him. The following year, Dutch colonists signed the Flushing Remonstrance to permit more religious freedom.

Wickenden served as the fourth minister at the Baptist church in Providence.

== Later life ==
Roger Williams brought a presentment against William Wickenden, Thomas Harris, and Thomas Angell on March 13, 1656, charging them as ringleaders of a division within the colony regarding the teaching of liberty. Williams never, however, came forward to prosecute the charge. William Wickenden died on February 23, 1671, in Providence. After Wickenden's death, his son-in-law, John Steere, and his daughter Hannah sold the area now comprising Wickenden Street.

== References and external links ==
Notes

- History of the Baptists by Thomas Armitage, describing Wickenden
- Wickenden genealogy
