= Samuel Petto =

English Calvinist and clergyman

- Born: c. 1624
- Died: 21 September 1711
- Resting place: Churchyard, Sudbury, Suffolk, England
- Education: Cambridge University
- Occupations: Puritan clergyman and theologian
- Known for: Contribution to development of British covenant theology

Samuel Petto (c. 1624–1711) was an English Calvinist, a Cambridge graduate, and an Independent Puritan clergyman who primarily ministered in Sudbury, Suffolk. He was a prolific theologian who made a notable contribution to the development of British covenant theology by describing the link between the covenant of works and the covenant of grace and also demonstrating the relationship between justification and covenant theology. Additionally, he wrote two catechisms and a book advocating lay preaching. He also had close ties with a radical political movement.

== Early life ==
Petto was born in England in 1624, though his birthplace and parentage are unknown. Petto's early life coincided with the tumultuous reign of Charles I. It is possible that the turbulent times influenced Petto's decision to embrace religious nonconformity. Despite the religious turmoil of the times, Petto attended Cambridge University to study to become a minister. He was enrolled in St Catharine's College, Cambridge as a "sizar" (a student granted a ration of food and lodging for free due to financial need). Petto graduated with his bachelor's degree in 1647, and some records indicate that he also earned a master's degree, though no date is given. St Catharine's College was considered a centre for theological study. Petto would have studied under Ralph Brownrigg (1592-1659) and William Spurstowe (1605–66), both of whom were delegates at the Westminster Assembly and Calvinistic in their theology. This Calvinistic influence was seen later as Petto favorably quoted John Calvin (1509–64), Richard Sibbes (1577-1635), Samuel Bolton (1606–54), John Owen (1616–83), and the Heidelberg Catechism.

== Ministerial career ==
Petto was ordained to the ministry in 1648. He was installed as rector at Sandcroft in the deanery of South Elmham. It seems that he was married soon afterward, eventually having five children. In 1655, his wife Mary died. In 1657, he was appointed as an assistant to the Suffolk commission of Triers and Objectors, which examined ministers, candidates, and their qualifications. Petto was an Independent or Non-Separating Congregationalist. Their confession of faith was the Savoy Declaration of Faith and Order (1658), which was essentially a version of the Westminster Confession of Faith modified to fit Congregationalist church polity (it was based on local churches, not national or regional assemblies).

While formally trained as a minister, Petto's ecclesiology allowed him to teach that qualified laymen could be allowed to preach in congregations. This view was keenly contested and Petto defended his position at great length. When the crown was restored in 1660, Petto was ejected from his pulpit. By 1669, Petto was ministering in Norfolk.

In 1672, he was officially licensed as a congregational minister under Charles II's Act of Indulgence. Petto began his longest tenure as a minister in 1674, when he became the minister of a congregation in the town of Sudbury, Suffolk. It was an independent congregation that met in a barn belonging to Robert Sewell. The congregation filled a need in the town, which had not had a regular minister for some time. The congregation was called All Saints' Church and Petto ministered there until his death 1711. He was buried in the churchyard on September 21.

== Theological opinions ==
In addition to being an Independent minister, Petto was also a well-respected theologian. His first work was on Pneumatology (doctrine of the Holy Spirit) and it dealt primarily with the doctrine of assurance of salvation and the Spirit's work of sealing. Following mainstream Puritan thought, Petto believed that sealing of the Spirit was a separate act from the indwelling of the Spirit. The sealing of the Spirit granted to individual believers the confidence that God was their Father and that they were truly converted. Later in life Petto seemed to have shifted in his view and like Owen began to see that sealing and indwelling were more closely related, and that both were given to believers upon their initial salvation.

He wrote two catechisms, A Short Scriptural Catechism for Little Children and A Large Scriptural Catechism, while in Norfolk. The catechism answers were quotations of various biblical passages and the catechisms were designed to encourage memorization of the Bible. Petto also believed that qualified laymen could preach in churches (see above).

Petto also seems to have had some ties to the Fifth Monarchy movement, though it is not clear how closely he was connected. This group wanted the nation to be ruled by Christians and to have the laws based on the Bible. The name was taken from Nebuchadnezzar's dream in the book of Daniel, where four kingdoms are represented (Babylon, Medo-Persia, Greece, and Rome). The fifth kingdom was the kingdom of Christ that would possibly be established around the year 1666. He associated with Frederick Woodal and published with John Tillinghast (d. 1655) Six Several Treatises of John Tillinghast, both leading members of the Fifth Monarchy movement. This close association with this group did not seem to damage Petto's relationship with John Owen, who was one of the leading Independent opponents of the movement.

Petto's greatest theological influence came from his highly regarded work on covenant theology, The difference between the Old and New Covenant Stated and Explained: With an Exposition of the Covenant of Grace in the Principal Concernments of it. In this work Petto skillfully navigated and addressed the many contemporary debates concerning covenant theology showing an exceptional, detailed understanding of the subject. Petto explored the relationship of the Mosaic covenant with the covenant of grace. He made an important connection between the covenants and the Protestant doctrine of justification. His careful work won him the praise of many contemporary theologians including the eminent John Owen, who wrote the book's foreword.

== Influence ==
While Petto was influential in his own time, he has not received as much attention in modern times despite a recent resurgence in Puritan studies. One reason for his lack of long-term influence may have been his Independent church convictions as well as his more radical political associations with the Fifth Monarchy movement. Nevertheless, Petto's combination of vigorous pastoral ministry and sophisticated theological acumen is typical of many Puritan and Reformed ministers. As research on this time period continues, perhaps Petto's influence will be better understood and appreciated.
