= Scotch Plains Baptist Church =

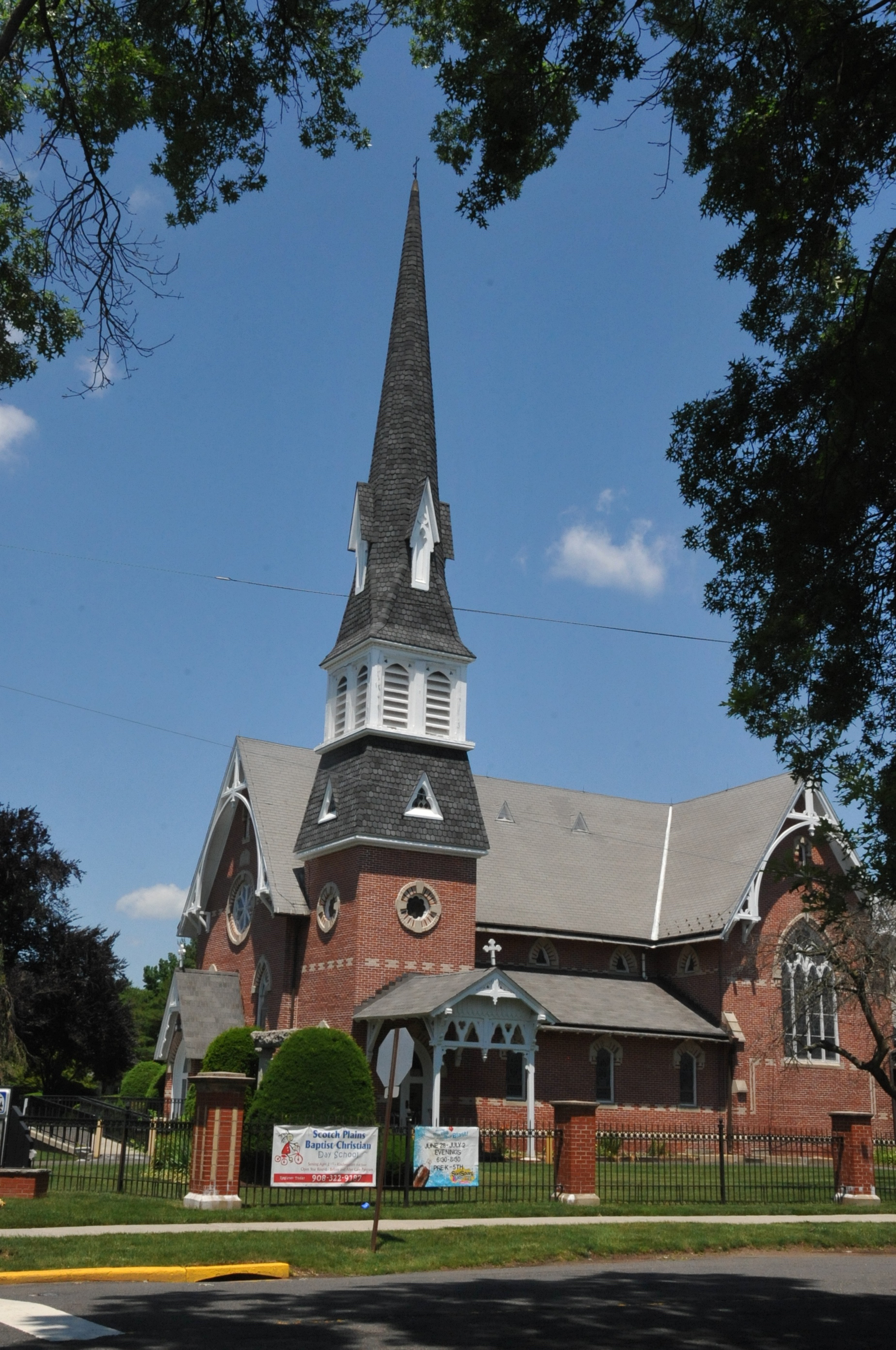
- Interactive map of the Scotch Plains Baptist Church area

General information
- Architectural style: Gingerbread Ruskinian Gothic
- Location: 333-347 Park Avenue, Scotch Plains, New Jersey, United States
- Construction started: 1870 (for present church)
- Completed: c.1740 (for 1st church) c.1816 (for 2nd church); 1870 (for 3rd and present church)
- Demolished: 1816 (fire--1st church)
- Client: Scotch Plains Baptist Church

Technical details
- Structural system: Masonry brick with Ohio stone dressing
- Scotch Plains Baptist Church, Parsonage, and Cemetery
- U.S. National Register of Historic Places
- New Jersey Register of Historic Places
- Location within Union County, New Jersey Location within New Jersey Location within the United States
- Coordinates: 40°39′9″N 74°23′59″W
- Architect: Thomas A. Roberts
- Architectural style: Late Victorian: Gothic; Colonial: Georgian
- NRHP reference No.: 13000386
- NJRHP No.: 5041

Significant dates
- Added to NRHP: June 14, 2013
- Designated NJRHP: March 27, 2013

The Scotch Plains Baptist Church is a historic Baptist church located at Park Avenue in Scotch Plains, New Jersey. It was added to the National Register of Historic Places as part of the Scotch Plains Baptist Church, Parsonage, and Cemetery listing on June 14, 2013. The listing includes the nearby Old Baptist Parsonage, previously listed individually in 1973.

== History ==
The present church is located in an American Revolutionary War-era cemetery known as "God’s Little Acre", with Watchung Mountains-quarried brown sandstone grave markers dating back to 1742. The original church dated from the early 18th century. After a fire, it was rebuilt around 1816. The present church was built in 1871 in a Gingerbread Ruskinian Gothic style “made of pressed brick with Ohio stone and white brick trimmings.”

Buried the church's cemetery is Caesar, who died on February 7, 1806, at 104 years of age. He was born in Africa and brought to America as a slave. He was freed from slavery in 1769. During the Revolutionary War Caesar drove a wagon and delivered supplies to the Continental troops at Blue Hills Fort and Camp.

== See also ==
- National Register of Historic Places listings in Union County, New Jersey
