= Samuel Stillman =

American Baptist minister

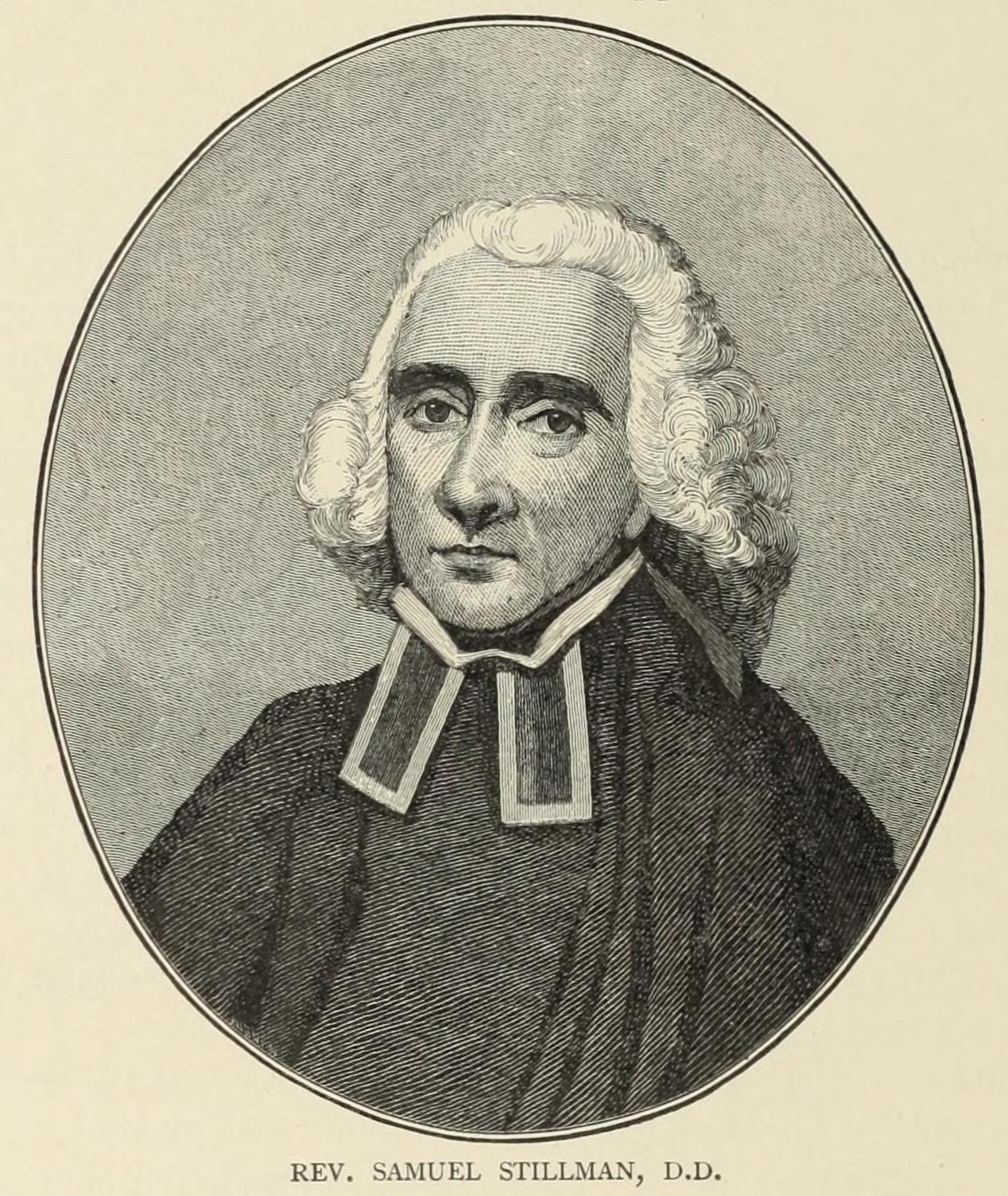
- Born: February 27, 1737; Philadelphia, Province of Pennsylvania
- Died: March 11, 1807 (aged 70); Boston, Massachusetts
- Resting place: Granary Burying Ground

Samuel Stillman (1737–1807) was an American Baptist minister. From 1765 until his death in 1807, Stillman served as pastor of Boston's First Baptist Church of Boston, Massachusetts; for these 42 years, Stillman was considered "the leading Baptist minister in New England, if not the United States." Stillman was an original trustee of Rhode Island College (now Brown University) and played a leading role in the establishment of the Massachusetts Baptist Missionary Society in 1802.

== Life ==
Samuel Stillman was born on February 27 [O.S.], 1737 in Philadelphia, Province of Pennsylvania. In 1748, the Stillman family moved to Charleston, Province of South Carolina. Stillman's inclination for the ministry was recognized by Oliver Hart of the First Baptist Church of Charleston. Hart converted and baptized Stillman in 1754 and immediately began training him for ministerial service. Stillman preached his first sermon on February 17, 1758, and was ordained on February 26, 1759.

After ordination, Stillman accepted a pastoral position on James Island. On a visit to his native Philadelphia, Stillman married Hannah Morgan—the daughter of a Welsh merchant family and sister of noted physician John Morgan. During his visit to Philadelphia, Stillman was awarded an honorary Master of Arts from the then recently founded College of Philadelphia. In 1761, he received another honorary Master of Arts from Harvard University.

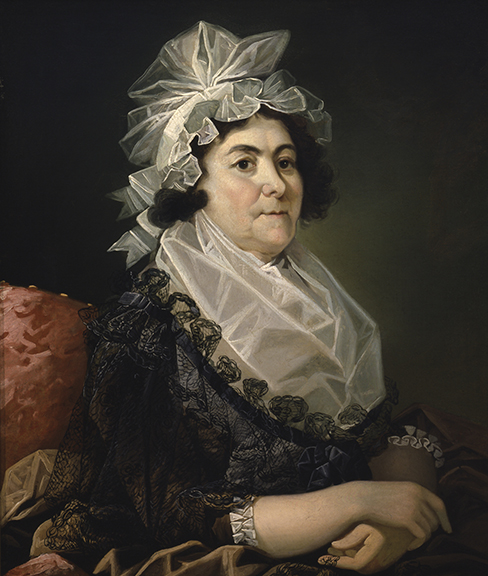
Hannah Stillman née Morgan—Samuel Stillman's wife

In 1764, Stillman joined the Reverend James Manning, the Reverend Ezra Stiles, the Reverend Isaac Backus, the Reverend John Gano, the Reverend Morgan Edwards, William Ellery, and former Royal Governors Stephen Hopkins and Samuel Ward among thirty-five others as an original fellow or trustee for the chartering of the College in the English Colony of Rhode Island and Providence Plantations (the original name for Brown University). Stillman received an honorary Doctor of Divinity from Brown in 1788.

In 1765 Stillman became minister of the First Baptist Church (Boston, Massachusetts)—a position he held until his death. In 1773, Stillman purchased a house at the northern corner of Sheaffe and Salem Streets in Boston's North End. The house stood immediately opposite of that of Robert Newman, a patriot and sexton of Old North Church, known for lighting the churchs' steeple during the Battles of Lexington and Concord. Robert Newman also served as Sexton of the First Baptist Church of Boston (church record.)

John Hancock, although a Unitarian, was one of his admirers and often rented a pew there so that he could hear him. President John Adams and General Henry Knox also came to hear him preach.

Stillman died on March 11 or 12 1807, after suffering a fatal paralysis. He is buried in the Granary Burying Ground, at the edge of Beacon Hill.

== American Revolutionary Period ==
He was a member of the American Philosophical Society and was politically active as a member of the 1779 Massachusetts Senate Convention for the formation of the State constitution; and also for the 1788 adoption of the United States Constitution. According to editor Frank Moore, Stillman was "a member of the Senate Convention for the formation of the state constitution in 1779; as also for the adoption of the federal constitution in 1788; in the last body he delivered a very eloquent speech in its support, and was considered at the time as having contributed much toward its adoption, and confirmed many members in its favor who were previously wavering upon that question. To that constitution he ever after continued a firm, unshaken friend, and a warm approver of the administration of Washington and Adams."

In 1802, Samuel Stillman was instrumental in founding the first Baptist Missionary Society in America (now known as The American Baptist Churches of Massachusetts).
