= Separate Baptists in Christ =

The General Association of Separate Baptists in Christ
- Polity: Congregationalist
- Official website: http://www.separatebaptist.org

The Separate Baptists in Christ are a denomination of Separate Baptists found mostly in United States.

== History ==
The Separate Baptists had no formal statement of faith before 1776. They purported to only follow the Bible. In 1776 there was split in the Separate Baptist movement over the Arminian system. This split was in part due to the preaching of John Walker who was known as a "very able preacher". At the 1776 session of the General Association of the Separate Baptists in Virginia, Elder John Waller used Corinthians 13:11 in his sermon against particular redemption which outlined the basis on which he and the ministers of churches he and they had started withdrew from the General Association to form a network of "independent" Baptist churches who were accused of being "Arminians." In the 1780s many of the Separate Baptists who supported the Arminian view moved west into Kentucky and Tennessee. The Separate Baptists who are now known as the Separate Baptist in Christ come from these people who settled in Kentucky and Tennessee. They started the churches who formed the South Kentucky Association of the Separate Baptist in 1786. Over the years a large number of these churches folded into other groups like the United Baptists or Campbellites (also known as the Christian Churches). The South Kentucky Association of Separate Baptists choose not to stay in any union.

== Associations ==
The present-day Separate Baptists in Christ descend from that association and others organized by it, which consists of the following surviving associations: Nolynn (KY, 1819); Ambraw (IL, 1844); Northern Indiana (IN, 1854); Central Indiana (IN, 1870); the Christian Unity in Virginia and North Carolina (1935), and Mt. Olive (TN, 1892 Dissolved around 2016). The old Kentucky Association is now called South Kentucky Association of Separate Baptists in Christ (org. 1785). A division of the Christian Unity Separate Baptist Association (org. 1935) united in fellowship with the Separate Baptists in 1975. Two associations have also been recently organized, the West Virginia Association and the Northeast Florida Association, each constituted with one church, but both have now dissolved. The churches and associations labored in 1912 to organize a general association, called the General Association of Separate Baptists. A general association had previously been organized in 1877, but it dissolved. Separate Baptist Missions, Inc. was formed in 1967. They also support Sunday Schools and youth camps. All local associations of Separate Baptists had participated in the General Association, but Ambraw withdrew in 1991 and Northern Indiana in 1992, each now independent associations. This division was precipitated by the General Association's adoption of an article which rejected premillennialism: "ARTICLE 12. We believe that, at Christ's coming in the clouds of Heaven, all Christians will be gathered with Him in the clouds and that time shall be no more, thus leaving no time for a literal one thousand year reign."

== Separate Baptist in Christ Ordinances ==
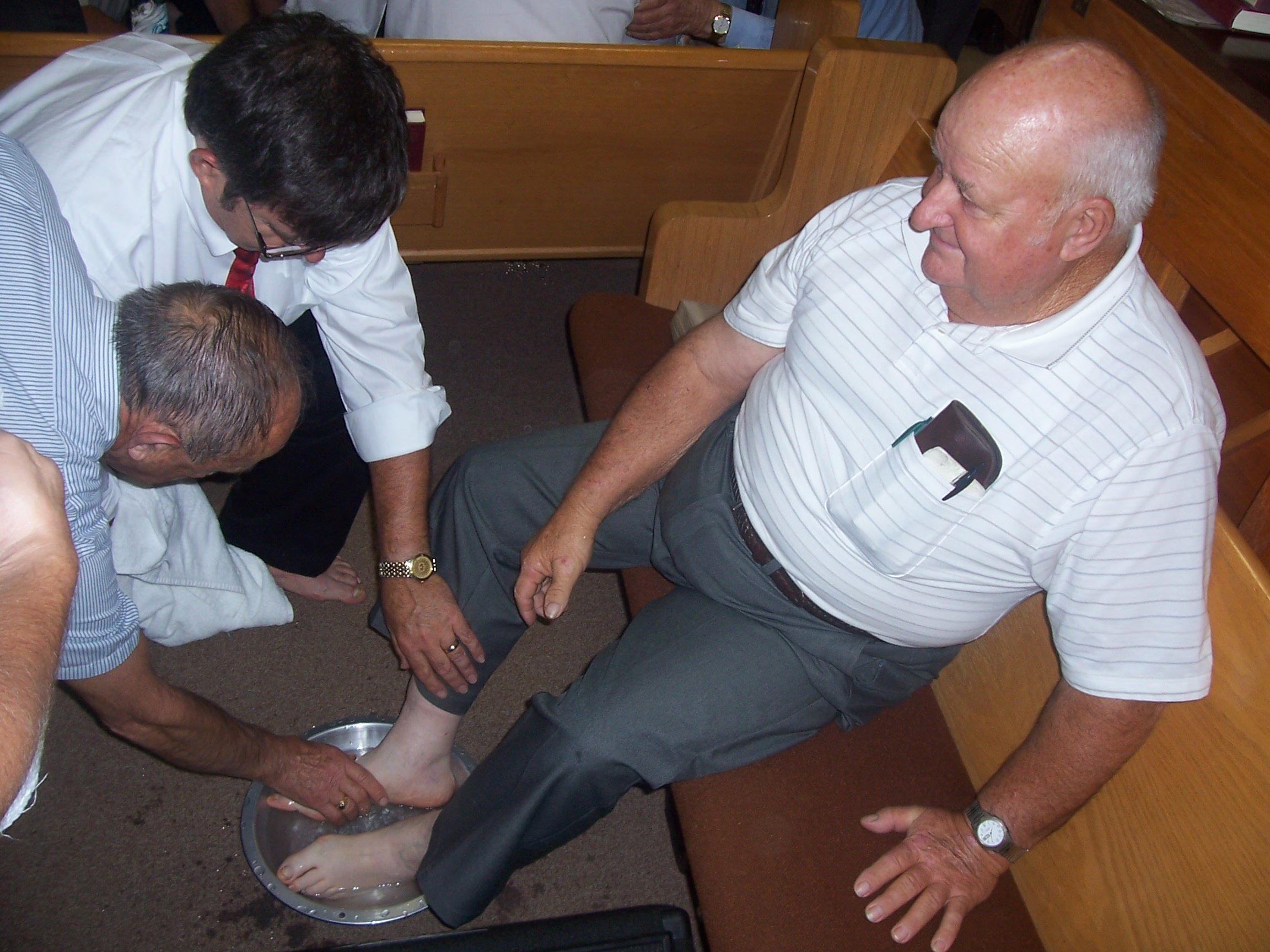
The Friday Night Communion and Foot Washing Service at the Nolynn Association of Separate Baptist in Christ. September 18, 2009

Separate Baptists hold a standard orthodoxy in common with many other Baptists. They hold five ordinances, Baptism, the Lord's Supper, the anointing with oil and laying on hands for the sick, right hand of fellowship, and feet washing. Separate Baptists hold many of these in common with Free Will Baptists, General Association of Baptists, Christian Baptist Church of God, Primitive Baptist, Pleasant Valley and Jasper Baptist Association, United Baptists, Union Baptists, Old Regular Baptists and many Independent Baptist Associations. Separate Baptists are Arminian in persuasion, believing "that he who endures to the end, the same shall be saved" rather than eternal security. Separate Baptist believe that a "saved" person can choose to turn from God to a life of sin. This is called "backsliding." The Separate Baptist believe a backslider must ask God for forgiveness of their sin. Separate Baptists hold this in common with Free Will Baptists, General Baptist, the General Six-Principle Baptists and some United Baptists. In 1999, the churches of the General Association numbered 80, with about 7500 members. The Ambraw and Northern Indiana Associations consist of approximately 1500 members in about 20 churches. This makes the total membership of all Separate Baptists about 9000 in 100 churches.

== International Separate Baptist in Christ Missions ==
There also are some Separate Baptists in Christ in the Ahmednagar district of India. These churches are not in association with the General Association. In 1993 Separate Baptist Missions, Inc. began contributing to missionaries Lonnie Palmer and Steve Palmer in their work among the Koulango in Ivory Coast, Africa, and have since began supporting Bro Jerry Ridge in the same mission.

== Sources ==
- Minutes of the General Association and local associations
- Baptists Around the World, by Albert W. Wardin, Jr.
- Dictionary of Baptists in America, Bill J. Leonard, editor
- Handbook of Denominations, by Frank Mead, Samuel Hill & Craig D. Atwood
