= General Association of Baptists =

Religious group

Though the annual meeting of this group is denominated The General Association of The Baptists, they are most widely known as the Kindred Associations of Baptists. Other names associated with these churches are the Baptist Church of Christ, The Baptists, and Separate Baptists (though they are not directly related to the Separate Baptists in Christ). The primary location of the churches is middle Tennessee and northern Alabama. Members from this association form the largest body of Baptists in Moore County, Tennessee.

== History ==
The history of The General Association of The Baptists begins with the formation of the Duck River Association in 1826. The earliest church in the region was constituted circa 1790 by Kentucky ministers Ambrose Dudley and John Taylor. The Elk River Association was formed in south-central Tennessee in 1806, in the fertile valley region formed by the Elk and Duck Rivers. As most of the Baptists of middle Tennessee, the churches of the Elk River Association were strongly Calvinistic in theology. Early in the 19th century, Alexander Campbell became connected with the Baptists for a time, and began to preach Arminian doctrine among them. Some Baptists of the region found this modification of theology appealing, and began to preach against limited atonement and unconditional election, declaring that Christ died for all mankind. The new sentiment became so strong in the Elk River Association that it led to division, and the Duck River Association of Separate Baptists was formed. The original name appears to have been "Duck River Baptist Association of Christ." An outspoken leader of the division was Elder William Keele. Others were soon embroiled in dispute over the new ideas, and other associations divided or had members withdraw from them. The majority of the Concord association held the more moderate Arminian position and the Calvinistic minority withdrew in 1827, creating two Concord associations. Some ministers and churches would move into the Campbell-Stone restoration movement. The Duck River Association would maintain a Baptist course. In the following years, several things developed among Tennessee Baptists, including the Baptist State Convention in 1833, the Union University of Murfreesboro, and the Baptist Publication and Sunday School Society. Discussion on whether to support these new endeavours caused friction that split the Duck River Association in 1843. Those who supported these new measures continue as the Duck River Association of Missionary Baptists and are affiliated with the Tennessee Baptist Convention and the Southern Baptist Convention. A mind of independence, coupled with opposition to the Calvinistic stance of the three organizations, would keep the Duck River Association of Separate Baptists from supporting them. According to the 1844 minutes of the missionary group, the dissenters could not "unite with you while you retain your Calvinistic doctrine."

The Duck River Baptists stayed their independent course and sought fellowship with like-minded Baptists. Through the years they developed correspondence with other Baptist associations - Mount Zion Association in 1835, Indian Creek in 1840, Union in 1848, Mount Moriah in 1851, Mount Pleasant circa 1860, East Union in 1890, Ebenezer and Mount Olive in 1891, Liberty in 1894, New Liberty in 1925, and Mount Pleasant No. 2 in 1965. Many of these fellowships are still maintained. In October 1939, delegates from Duck River, Mount Zion, Union, Mount Pleasant, Liberty, New Liberty and Ebenezer Associations, and the Pleasant Hill church of Kentucky, met at Garrison Fork Church, Bedford County, Tennessee, and organized The General Association of The Baptists. The stated purpose of this association is to "perpetuate a closer union and communion among us and to preserve and maintain a correspondence with each other." In 1936 there were 52 churches with 4564 members [Religious Bodies, 1936, Vol. II, Part 1].

== Faith and practice ==
These "Duck River" churches are considered one of the "primitivistic" sects among Baptists. They are moderately Calvinistic, retaining the teachings of total depravity and eternal security, while asserting that Jesus Christ tasted death for every man. Most of the churches have Sunday Schools, but no organized support of missionary or benevolent institutions. In addition to baptism and the Lord's supper, they observe the rite of feet washing as an ordinance. Services are informal; preaching is extemporaneous. Most of the churches use musical instruments, though some do not, especially the northern Alabama churches which are heavily influenced by the Sacred Harp style of southern folk music.

== The Twelve Articles of Faith ==
(From the Minutes of The One Hundred Sixty-Second Annual Session of The Union Association of The Baptist, Held with The Baptist Church of Christ at Spring Street, DeKalb County, Tennessee. October, 2008)

1. We believe in only one true and living God. the Father. the Word and the Holy Ghost, and these three are one. (Isaiah 45:22; 1 John 5:7)
2. We believe the Scriptures of the Old and New Testament to be the word of God, and the only rule of Faith and practice. (1st Peter 1:10-12; 2nd Peter 1:21; 2nd Timothy 3: 15–17)
3. We believe that by one man sin entered the World, and death by sin so death passed upon all men, for that all have sinned, and are by nature the children of wrath. (Romans 5: 12-17-19: Ephesians 2: 1–5)
4. We believe that Jesus Christ, by the Grace of God, tasted death for every man, and through his meritorious death the way of salvation is made possible for God to have mercy upon all who come unto him upon Gospel terms. (Hebrews 2:9-10: 10: 19-22: John 3: 16: Titus 2: II)
5. We believe that sinners are justified in the sight of God only by the Righteousness of God imputed upon them, through their Faith in the Lord Jesus Christ. (Ephesians 2:8-10; Romans 5:1-5; 3:21-28).
6. We believe that the Saints will persevere in Grace, and not one of them will be finally lost. (Romans 8:35-39; Hebrews 6:4-6, 18, 19; 1st John 3:9: St. John 10:27-29)
7. We believe that there will be a Resurrection of the dead. both of the just and the unjust. and general Judgment, and the happiness of the Righteous and the punishment of the wicked will be Eternal. (John 5:28-29; 1st Corinthians 15:42-49; 1st Thessalonians 4: 14–18)
8. We believe the visible Church of Christ is a congregation of Faithful men and women. who have given themselves to the Lord and obtained fellowship with each other, and have agreed to keep a Godly discipline according to the rules of the Gospel. (Matthew 16: 18: 18: 15-18: 1st Corinthians 12:27-28: Ephesians 2: 19–22)
9. We believe in revealed religion by operation of the Spirit, agreeable to the word of God. and that Jesus Christ is the great head of the Church, and the Government thereof is with the Body. (Matthew 16: 17: Galatians I: 15–16; 1st Corinthians 2:9-11)
10. We believe that true believers are the only fit subjects for Baptism and that immersion is the only mode, and that the Lord's Supper and the Washing of Saints' Feet are ordinances of Christ to be continued until his second corning. (Matthew 3:13-17: Mark 14:22-25: Matthew 28: 19–20; John 13:4-17)
11. We believe that none but regularly Baptized members have the right to commune at the Lord's Table, and no one has the right to administer the ordinance of the Gospel, except he be legally called and qualified. (Luke 10:2-3; Acts 13: 1–4; 1st Corinthians 5: II; II: 17; 20. 28, 29: Exodus 12:43-49)
12. We believe that the Lord's Day ought to be observed and set apart for the worship of God. and that no work or worldly business should be transacted thereon—works of piety and necessity excepted. (Acts 20:7; Colossians 2: 16–17)

== Status ==
The General Association of The Baptists is currently made up of seven associations – Mt. Zion Association of Baptist (TN), Mt. Pleasant Association of Baptists ["No. 1"] (AL), Mt. Pleasant Association [No. 2] of The Baptists (AL), East Union Association of The Baptist (TN), Union Association of The Baptist (TN) – and one independent church – Pleasant Hill Regular Baptist Church of Marion, Kentucky. In 2002, these represented a total membership of 10,393 in 97 churches. Correspondence was dropped with the Duck River Association of Baptists (TN) in 2018.

In addition to participation in the General Association, the local associations maintain correspondence with one another at their annual meetings. Each association is free to correspond with other like-minded associations that are not participating in the General Association, though there is no such correspondence at this time. In recent years there has been some interchange with the Town Creek Association of United Baptists (AL), and a failed attempt to achieve correspondence with the East Washington Association of Regular Baptists (AR).

== Sources ==
- General Association of Baptists minutes, 1999
- History of Middle Tennessee Baptists, by J. H. Grime
- A History of the Duck River Baptists, by Forrest Shelton Clark in The Quarterly Review, January–March 1973
- Tennessee Baptists: A Comprehensive History, by Albert W. Wardin, Jr.
- Minutes of The 162nd Annual Session of the Union Association of The Baptist, Held with The Baptist Church of Christ at Spring Street, DeKalb County, Tennessee. October, 2008
- Encyclopedia Americana, Baptist Church of Christ, The, 1920
