= History of Brown University =

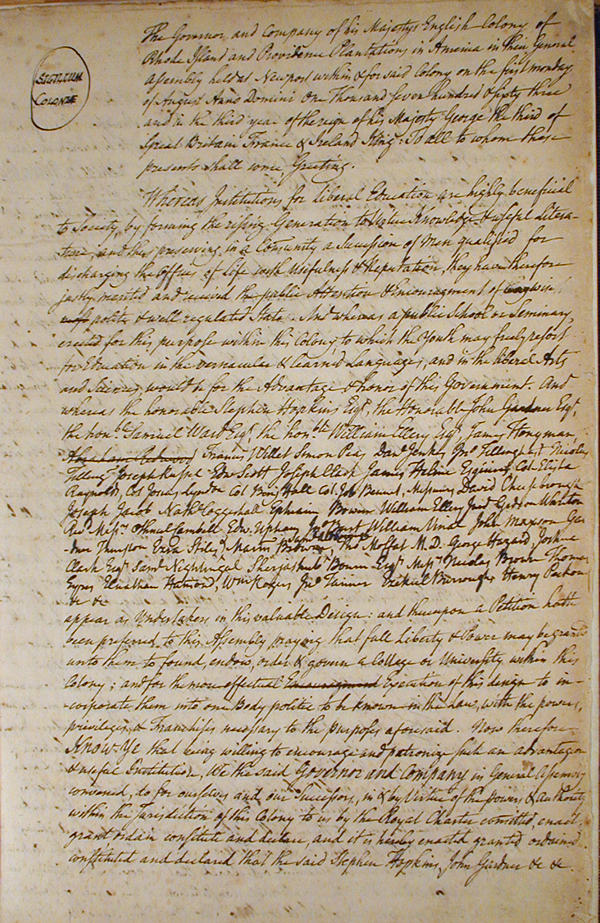
The 1764 Charter of the College in the English Colony of Rhode Island and Providence Plantations

The history of Brown University spans 262 years. Founded in 1764 as the College in the English Colony of Rhode Island and Providence Plantations, Brown is the seventh-oldest institution of higher education in the United States and the third-oldest institution of higher education in New England. At its foundation, the university was the first in the U.S. to accept students regardless of their religious affiliation. Brown's medical program is the third-oldest in New England while its engineering program is the oldest in the Ivy League. (Note: The school's founding was preceded by that of Harvard Medical School and Dartmouth Medical School. While Yale chartered a medical school in 1810, instruction did not begin for another three years.)

The university was one of the early doctoral-granting U.S. institutions in the late 19th century, adding masters and doctoral studies in 1887.

In 1969, Brown adopted its Open Curriculum—which has since come to define the university's approach to undergraduate education. In 1971, Brown's coordinate women's institution, Pembroke College, was fully merged into the university.

== Establishment ==
=== Charter ===
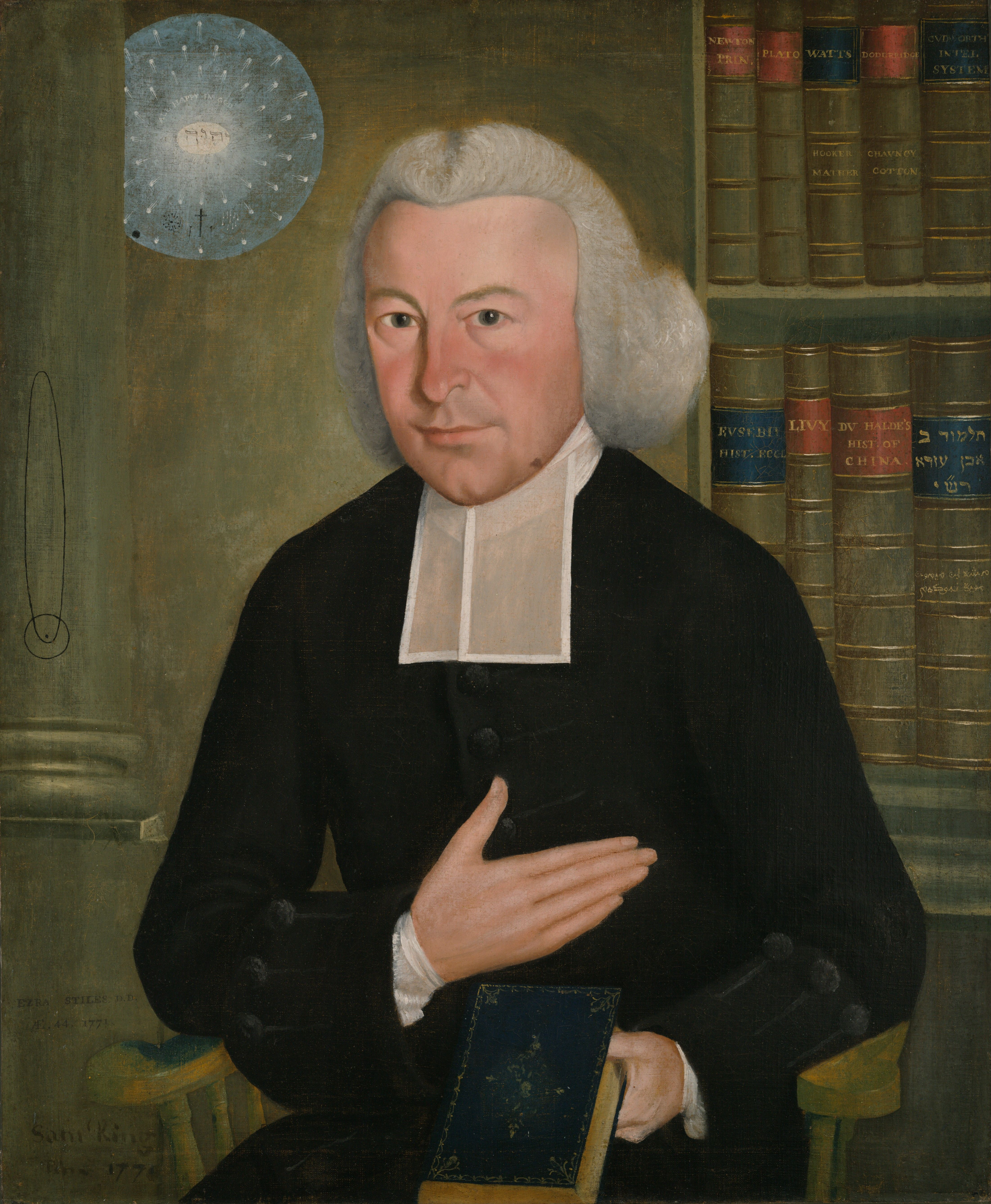
Ezra Stiles played a key role in the establishment of Brown University

==== Early petitions ====
Brown University's origin dates to 1761, when three residents of Newport, Rhode Island, drafted a petition to the colony's General Assembly:

That your Petitioners propose to open a literary institution or School for instructing young Gentlemen in the Languages, Mathematics, Geography & History, & such other branches of Knowledge as shall be desired. That for this End... it will be necessary... to erect a public Building or Buildings for the boarding of the youth & the Residence of the Professors.

The three petitioners were Ezra Stiles, pastor of Newport's Second Congregational Church and future president of Yale University; William Ellery, Jr., future signer of the United States Declaration of Independence; and Josias Lyndon, future governor of the colony.

According to Stiles's biographer, Edmund Morgan, the young minister saw in Newport's religious diversity "an opportunity to join with Christians of other denominations in a project which would exemplify their common faith in free inquiry.... a college in which the major religious groups of the colony should unite in the pursuit of knowledge."

The editor of Stiles's papers observes, "This draft of a petition connects itself with other evidence of Dr. Stiles's project for a Collegiate Institution in Rhode Island, before the charter of what became Brown University." There is further documentary evidence that Stiles was making plans for a college in 1762. On January 20, Chauncey Whittelsey, pastor of the First Church of New Haven, answered a letter from Stiles:

The week before last I sent you the Copy of Yale College Charter ... Should you make any Progress in the Affair of a Colledge, I should be glad to hear of it; I heartily wish you Success therein.

==== Philadelphia Baptists ====
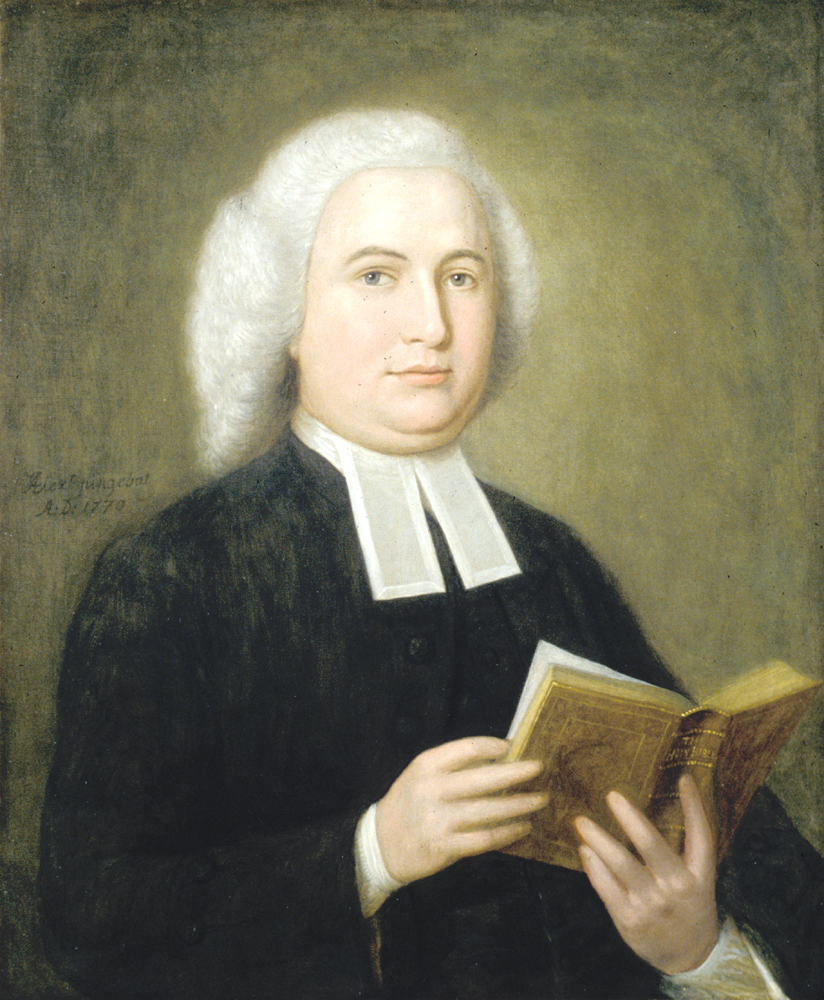
Brown's first president, minister James Manning

The Philadelphia Association of Baptist Churches offered the impetus for establishing a college in Rhode Island—home of the mother church of their denomination. While the Baptists had established Hopewell Academy in 1756, they remained unrepresented among the colonial colleges. The Congregationalists had Harvard and Yale, the Presbyterians had the College of New Jersey and the Episcopalians had the College of William and Mary and King's College. Isaac Backus, a historian of the New England Baptists and an inaugural Trustee of Brown, wrote of the October 1762 resolution taken at Philadelphia:

The Philadelphia Association obtained such an acquaintance with our affairs, as to bring them to an apprehension that it was practicable and expedient to erect a college in the Colony of Rhode-Island, under the chief direction of the Baptists; ... Mr. James Manning, who took his first degree in New-Jersey college in September, 1762, was esteemed a suitable leader in this important work.

==== Writing a charter ====
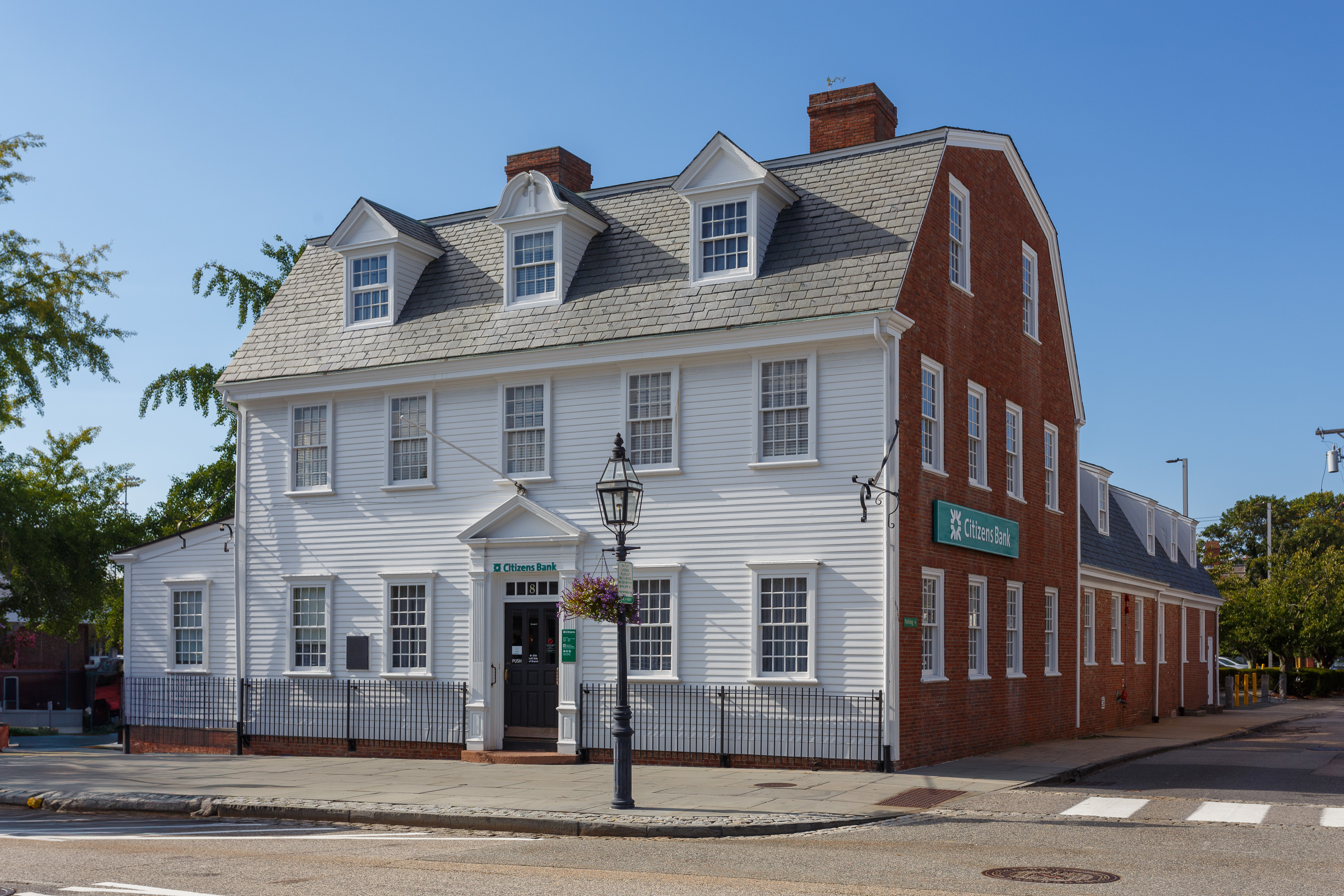
8 Washington Square, in Newport, where James Manning first presented his plans to form a Baptist college in the colony.

James Manning arrived at Newport in July 1763. There, he organized a meeting with 15 Baptist men in the home of Deputy Governor John Gardner (8 Washington Square) to discuss and publicly present his plans to organize a college.

In Newport, Manning was introduced to Stiles, who agreed to write the Charter for the college. Stiles's first draft was read to the General Assembly in August 1763 and rejected by Baptist members who worried that their denomination would be underrepresented in the College Board of Fellows. An amended charter, which secured the Baptists' control of both branches of the College's Corporation was passed by the House of Magistrates and the Upper House on March 2 and 3, 1764 in East Greenwich.

Dismayed by this move towards sectarianism, Stiles declined a seat on the College's Corporation, writing that Baptists had seized "the whole Power and Government of the College and thus by the Immutability of the numbers establishing it a Party College." Stiles continued to work towards his vision of a non-sectarian institution after Brown's establishment, presenting in 1770, a petition for the establishment of another college in Newport.

The charter had more than sixty signatories, including the brothers John, Nicholas and Moses of the Brown family, who would later inspire the College's modern name following a gift bestowed by Nicholas Brown, Jr. The college's mission, as stated in the charter, was to prepare students "for discharging the Offices of Life with usefulness & reputation" by providing instruction "in the Vernacular and Learned Languages, and in the liberal Arts and Sciences." The charter's language has long been interpreted by the university as discouraging the founding of a business school or law school. Brown continues to be one of only two Ivy League colleges with neither a business school nor a law school, the other being Princeton.

At the time of its creation, Brown's Charter was a uniquely progressive document. Other colleges had curricular strictures against opposing doctrines, while Brown's Charter asserted, "Sectarian differences of opinions, shall not make any Part of the Public and Classical Instruction." The charter additionally "recognized more broadly and fundamentally than any other the principle of denominational cooperation." The oft-repeated statement that Brown's Charter alone prohibited a religious test for College membership is inaccurate; other college charters were similarly liberal in that particular.

In September 1764, the inaugural meeting of the Corporation—the college's governing body—was held at Newport. Governor Stephen Hopkins was chosen chancellor, former and future governor Samuel Ward vice chancellor, John Tillinghast treasurer, and Thomas Eyres secretary. The Charter stipulated that the Board of Trustees should be composed of 22 Baptists, five Quakers, five Episcopalians, and four Congregationalists. Of the 12 Fellows, eight should be Baptists—including the College president—"and the rest indifferently of any or all Denominations."

=== Founding ===
The college was founded as Rhode Island College, on the site of the First Baptist Church at the corner of Main and Miller Streets in Warren, Rhode Island. James Manning was sworn in as the College's first president in 1765 and remained in the role until 1791. The College's first commencement was held in Warren in September 1769. The original church building was burned to the ground by British and Hessian soldiers in 1778; the present First Baptist Church of Warren stands on the original site.

In 1769, the erection of a building for the College was proposed, raising the question of whether Warren should serve as the College's permanent location. Among the requirements for the College's location were a place of "clear and wholesome air... where the morals of the inhabitants [were] not corrupted ... civil and religious liberty [was] encouraged ... there [were] assemblies of the different denominations" and labor and building materials were readily available. East Greenwich was proposed first but soon eclipsed by Providence, which was desired for its central location, cost of living, schoolhouses, and public library. Since wealthy Newport could likely raise more money to support the College than Providence, James Manning suggested in an anonymous letter that the Brown family contribute to the cost of erecting a building.

In 1770, the College moved to its present location in Providence. This move was protested by residents of Newport; in February 1770 William Ellery reportedly discussed the potential establishment of a rival college in Newport with Ezra Stiles.

Following its move to Providence, the College was temporarily located on the second floor of the Brick Schoolhouse. During this time, a debate ensued between Providence's East and West sides over where the College should be located.

=== Building a campus ===
After relocating to Providence, work began on establishing a permanent campus for the College, an effort that culminated in the construction of University Hall.

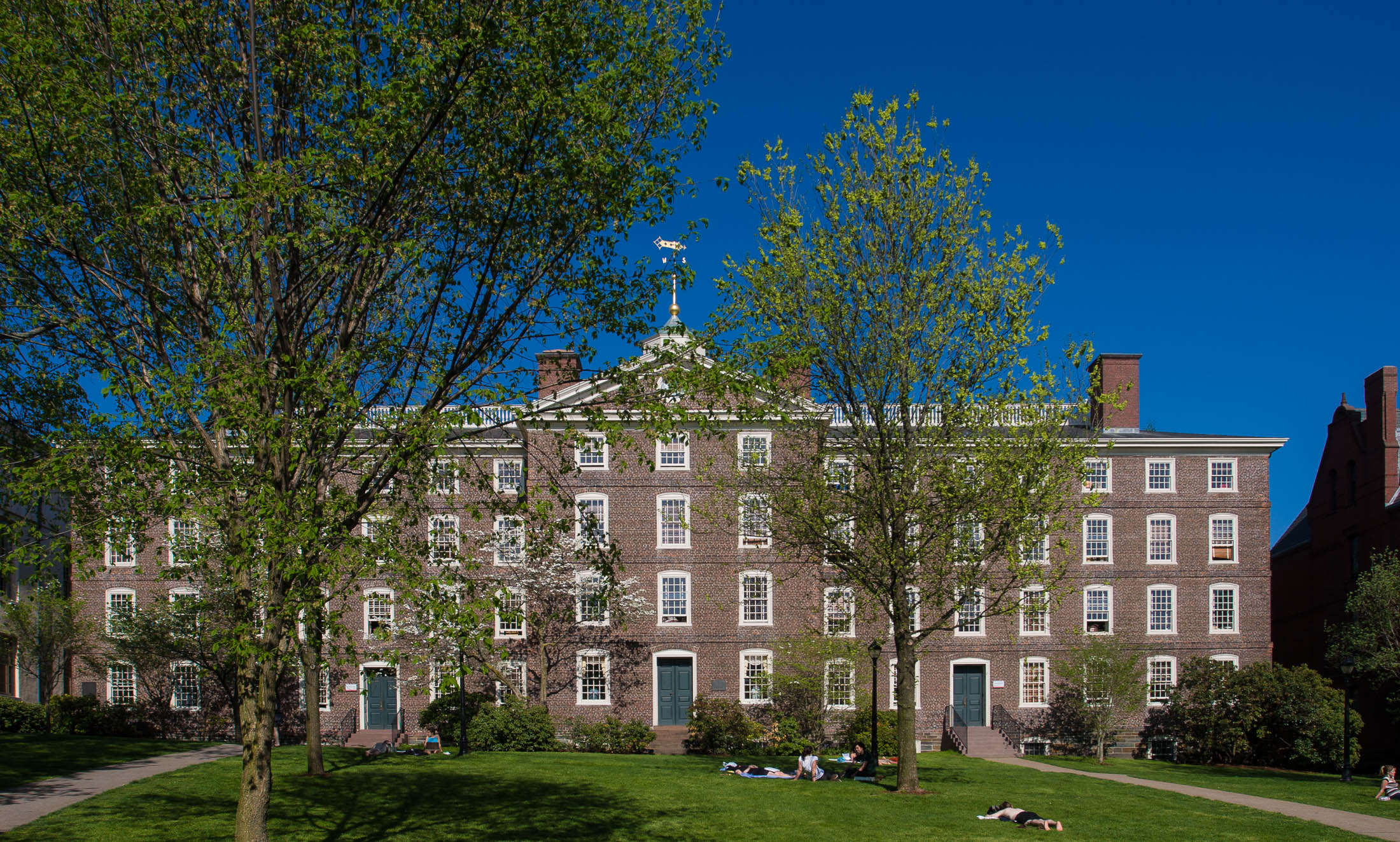
University Hall, Brown's first building, was constructed in 1770

In 1770, John and Moses Brown purchased a four acre lot on the East Side of Providence on behalf of the school. The majority of the property fell within the bounds of the original home lot of Chad Brown, an ancestor of the Browns and one of the original proprietors of Providence Plantations. A building committee, organized by the Corporation, developed plans for the College's first purpose-built edifice, finalizing a design on February 9, 1770.

On February 17 the building committee placed a notice in the Providence Gazette soliciting donations of timber and other materials. Among the effort's benefactors were Prominent Newport merchant and slave trader Aaron Lopez. The workforce involved in the construction of the building was diverse, reflecting the ethnic and social admixture of colonial Providence's population. Slaves, free people of color, indigenous people, and white laborers—both skilled and unskilled—worked to erect the structure. Construction began on March 26, 1770; the roof of the building was raised in October of the same year 1770.

=== Funding ===
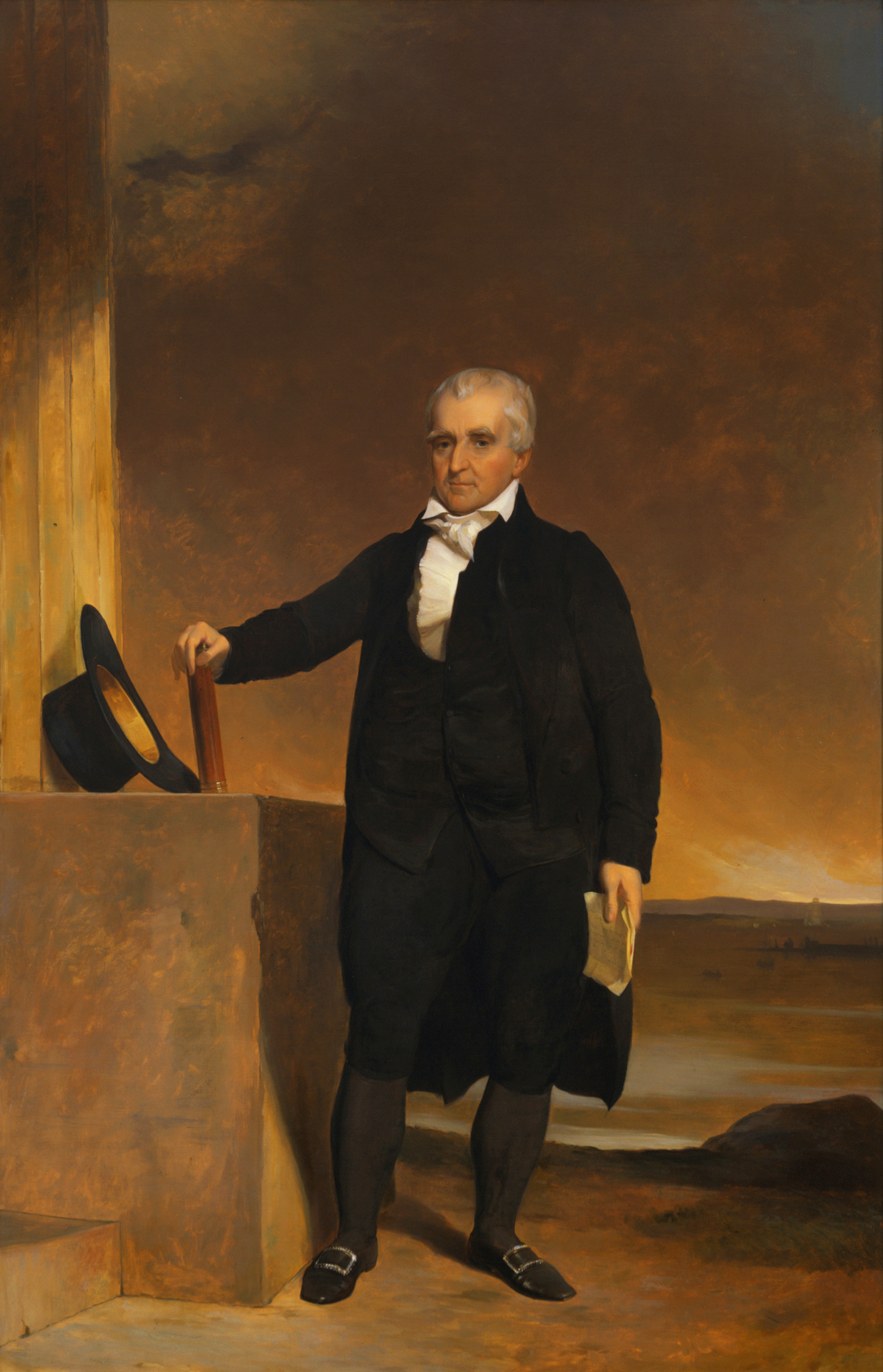
A posthumous portrait of Nicholas Brown, Jr., a benefactor of the College and its namesake

At the time of its founding, tuition at Brown was $12 a year. This amount was insufficient to cover the new college's expenses, so its trustees looked to benefactors for funding. In 1766, Rev. Morgan Edwards traveled to Europe to "solicit Benefactions for this Institution." During his year and a half stay in the British Isles, the reverend secured $4,300 in funding. Among the benefactors who contributed to this sum were Thomas Penn and Benjamin Franklin. A similar trip to the American South was later taken by Rev. Hezekiah Smith, who raised an additional $1,700.

==== Brown family ====
Nicholas Brown, his son Nicholas Brown, Jr. (class of 1786), John Brown, Joseph Brown, and Moses Brown were instrumental in moving the College to Providence, constructing its first building, and securing its endowment. Joseph became a professor of natural philosophy at the College; John served as its treasurer from 1775 to 1796; and Nicholas Jr. succeeded his uncle as treasurer from 1796 to 1825.

On September 8, 1803, the Corporation voted, "That the donation of $5000 Dollars, if made to this College within one Year from the late Commencement, shall entitle the donor to name the College." The following year, the appeal was answered by College treasurer Nicholas Brown, then a Junior. In a letter dated September 6, 1804, Brown committed "a donation of Five Thousand Dollars to Rhode Island College, to remain in perpetuity as a fund for the establishment of a Professorship of Oratory and Belles Letters." In recognition of the gift, the Corporation on the same day voted, "That this College be called and known in all future time by the Name of Brown University." Over the years, the benefactions of Nicholas Brown, Jr., totaled nearly $160,000 and included funds for the building of Hope College (1821–22) and Manning Hall (1834–35).

In 1904, the John Carter Brown Library, founded on the private collection of John Carter Brown, son of Nicholas Brown, Jr., was established as an independently funded research library on Brown's campus.

The Brown family was involved in various business ventures in Rhode Island, and accrued a portion of wealth through the Triangle Trade. The family itself was divided on the issue of slavey. John Brown had unapologetically defended slavery, while Moses Brown and Nicholas Brown Jr. were fervent abolitionists. Under the tenure of President Ruth Simmons, the University in 2003 established a steering committee to investigate these ties and recommend a strategy to address them.

== American Revolution ==
John Trumbull's Declaration of Independence (1818). The signers included Brown's first chancellor Stephen Hopkins. Hopkins wears a hat and stands in the back of the room near the door on the left.

Revolutionary sentiment is recorded early in Brown's history. At the College's first commencement in 1769, President Manning and the candidates for graduation dressed in clothes manufactured in America in protest of British trade laws. The class of 1775 organized a similar protest six years later, delivering a petition to the College's Corporation communicating that they were "deeply affected with the Distresses of our oppressed Country, which now most unjustly feels the baneful Effects of arbitrary power."

Brown's first Chancellor, Stephen Hopkins, served as a Delegate to the Colonial Congress in Albany in 1754 and to the Continental Congress from 1774 to 1776. He was a signatory to the United States Declaration of Independence on behalf of the state of Rhode Island. At the time of his signature of the Declaration of Independence, Stephen Hopkins served as both the Chief Justice of Rhode Island and Brown's Chancellor.

With British vessels patrolling Narragansett Bay in the fall of 1776, the College library was moved out of Providence for safekeeping. During the subsequent American Revolutionary War, Brown's University Hall was used to house French and other revolutionary troops led by General George Washington and the Comte de Rochambeau during the wait to commence the celebrated march of 1781 that led to the Siege of Yorktown and the Battle of the Chesapeake. The building functioned as barracks and hospital from December 10, 1776, to April 20, 1780, and as a hospital for French troops from June 26, 1780, to May 27, 1782.

In addition to Stephen Hopkins, a number of other founders of the College played significant roles in the American revolutionary effort and subsequent establishment of the United States. Among these were John Brown who led the Gaspee Affair, Chief Justice Joshua Babcock who served as a major general in the state militia, and William Ellery who acted as a signatory to the Declaration of Independence. Another founder, John Gano, served as a chaplain during the war and allegedly baptized General and future President George Washington.

James Mitchell Varnum, who graduated with honors in Brown's first graduating class of 1769, served as one of General George Washington's Continental Army brigadier generals and later as major general in command of the entire Rhode Island militia. Varnum is also noted as the founder and commander of the 1st Rhode Island Regiment, regarded as the first Black battalion in U.S. military history. David Howell, who graduated with an A.M. in 1769, served as a delegate to the Continental Congress from 1782 to 1785. In 1783, the Comte de Rochambeau and James Mitchell Varnum joined George Washington, Alexander Hamilton and several other distinguished officers as founding members of the Society of the Cincinnati.

== Late 18th Century ==
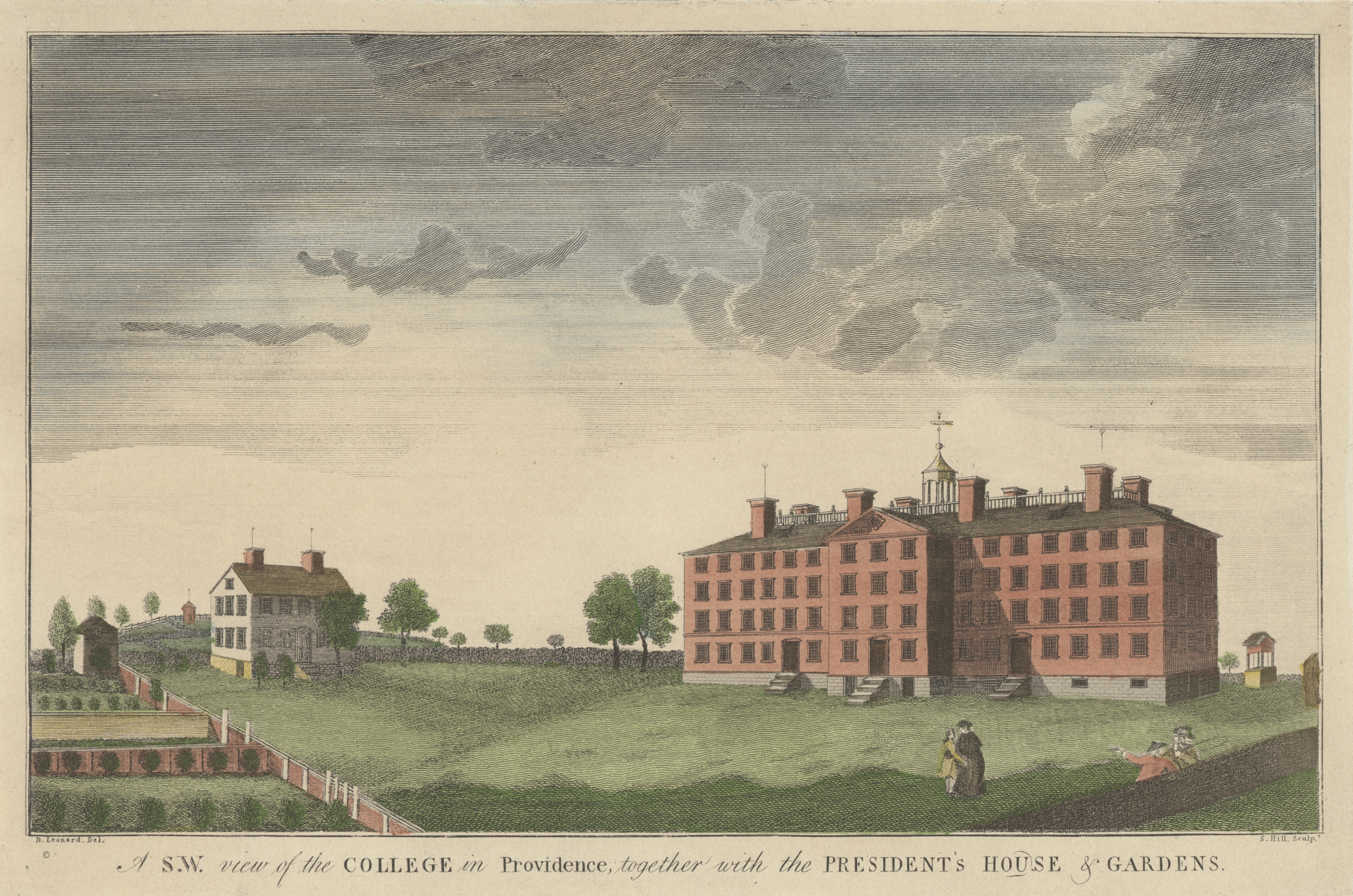
This copper-plate engraving from 1792 is the first known, published image of Brown. The original campus was a single academic building that was later named University Hall.

In 1786, the Rhode Island General Assembly unanimously elected College President James Manning to serve as its delegate in the 7th Congress of the Confederation. In the role, Manning served on the Grand Committee, which proposed fundamental amendments to the Articles of Confederation. In A History of the Baptists, President Manning is reported to have played an inspirational role in persuading the Massachusetts ratifying convention to adopt the United States Constitution.

George Washington visited the College in August of 1790. The newly elected president was accompanied by George Clinton and Thomas Jefferson, among others.

In 1800, enrollment at the College passed 100 students.

== 19th Century ==
=== Medical school ===
Notables

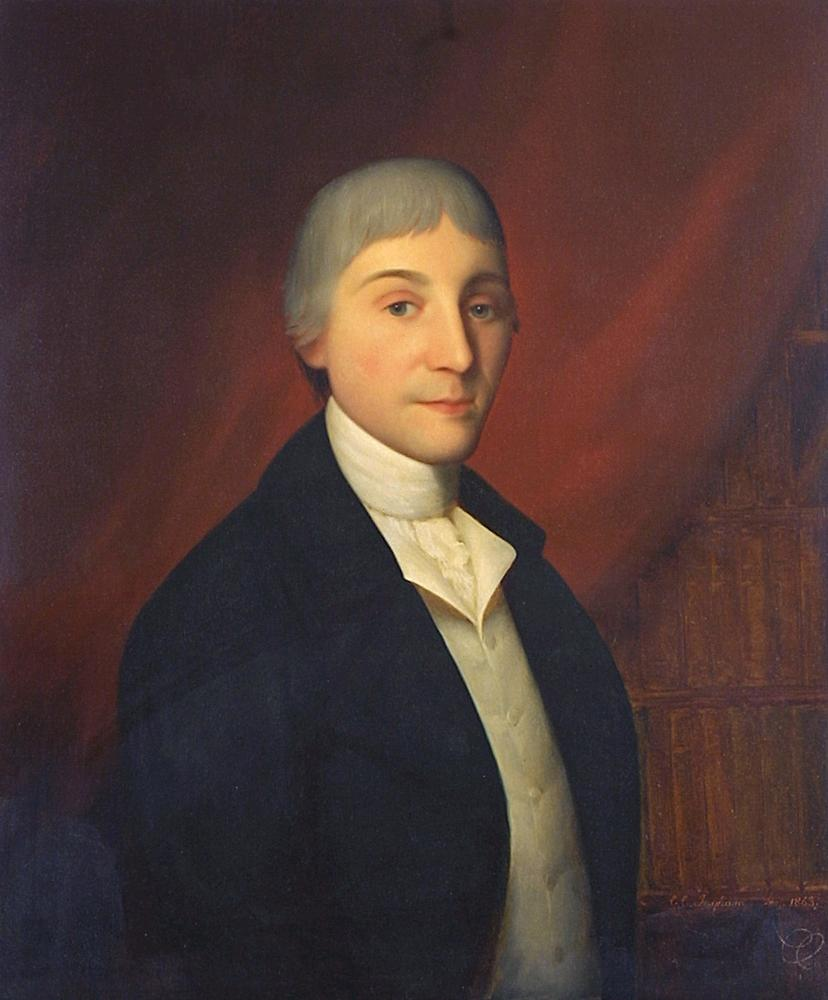
Solomon Drowne was one of Brown's first medical professors.

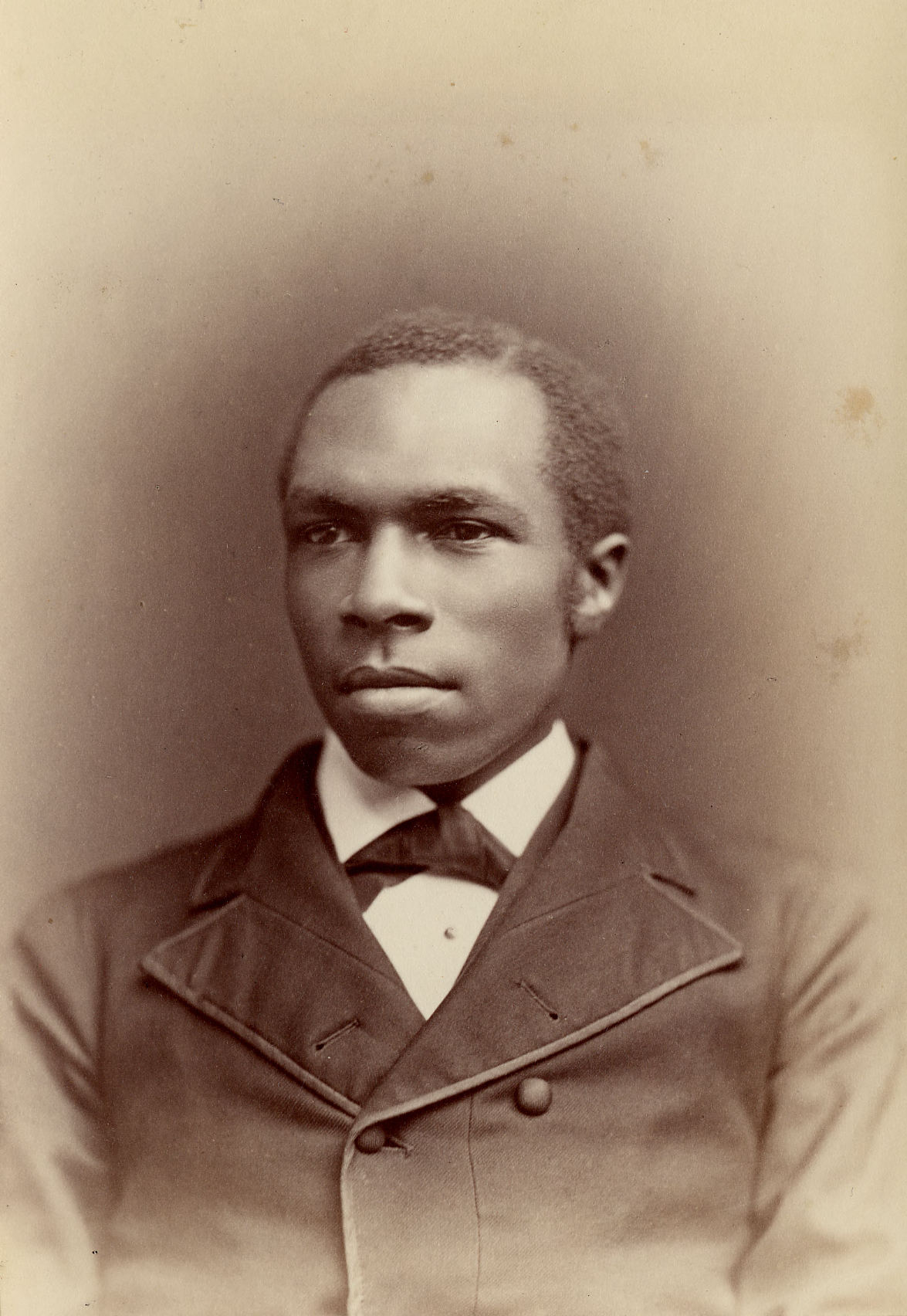
Inman E. Page was one of the first Black students to attend Brown University

Brown University first organized a medical program in 1811, with the appointment of three professors: Solomon Drowne, William Ingalls, and William Bowen. Preceded by medical programs at Harvard University and Dartmouth College, Brown was the third college in New England to offer instruction in medicine.

After assuming office in 1827, Brown's fourth president, Francis Wayland, called for all faculty to reside on campus. Through a residency policy, Wayland intended to increase the supervision of the student body and improve discipline. In March 1827, the Corporation of Brown University resolved that, in order to receive a salary, all faculty would be required to reside on the school's campus. Serving as voluntary clinical faculty, the medical school's physicians refused to jeopardize their practices in order to comply with the policy. Accordingly, President Wayland suspended the fledgling medical program, suggesting that medical education might be reinstated at a later date. Between its establishment in 1811 and suspension in 1827, 87 students graduated from the school.

=== Expansion ===
The early 19th century saw the start of Brown's expansion beyond University Hall. In 1822, the university constructed its second building, Hope College. Funded by Nicholas Brown Jr., the structure was designed to complement its predecessor. The construction of Hope College was succeeded by that of Manning Hall in 1834 and Rhode Island Hall in 1840. Together, these four buildings formed a row formation that later came to define the layout of Brown's central campus.

=== Engineering ===
In 1847, Brown established its engineering program, making it the first school in the Ivy League to do so. The program is also noted as third-oldest civilian engineering program in the United States. (Note: The program was preceded by that of the Rensselaer Institute (1824) and Union College (1845).)

Brown's first African-American students, George W. Milford and Inman E. Page, were admitted in the fall of 1873.

=== Women at Brown ===
Brown began to admit women when it established a Women's College in Brown University in 1891, which was later named Pembroke College in Brown University.

The first African-American woman, Ethel Ester Maria Tremaine Robinson, was admitted in 1901. She faced intense racism as well as sexism, however, she was elected to Phi Beta Kappa and graduated with honors with a Bachelor of Philosophy degree in 1905.

The College of Brown University merged with Pembroke College in 1971 and became co-educational.

Illustration of an aerial view of campus in 1908. Although the John Hay Library had not yet been built, the design had been approved so the artist included it.

== 20th century ==
=== The Plastic Age ===
In 1924, Brown professor Percy Marks published his first novel, The Plastic Age which detailed the decadence and depravity of campus life during the Jazz Age. The novel painted an unflattering picture of partying, boozing, sex, anti-Semitism, and other bad behavior perpetrated by Brown students including S. J. Perelman, who was a student of Marks. In response, the campus humor magazine The Brown Jug (which was edited by Perelman) honored Marks with a banquet.

=== New curriculum ===
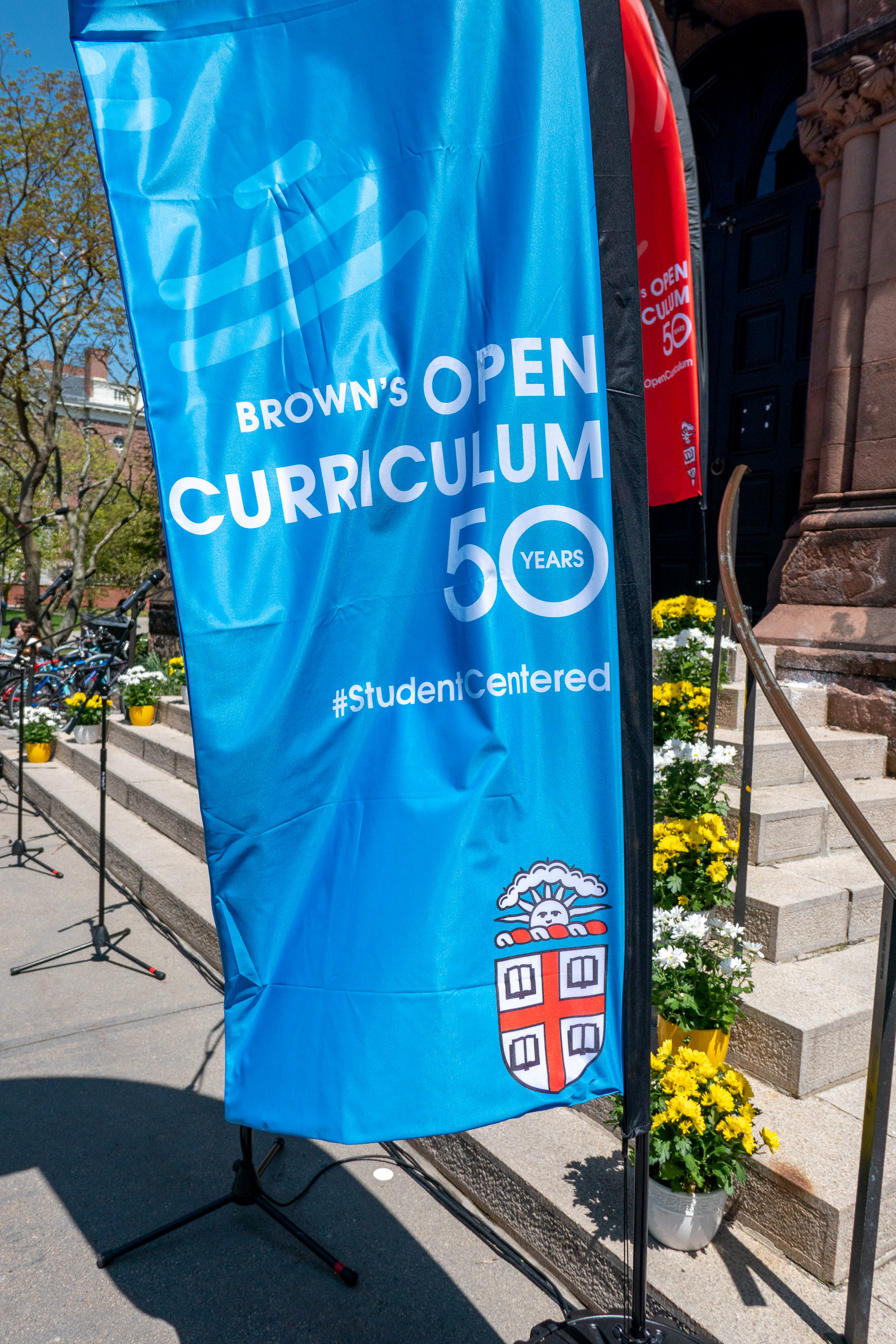
Brown's "New" Curriculum turned 50 in 2019

In 1850, Brown President Francis Wayland wrote: "The various courses should be so arranged that, insofar as practicable, every student might study what he chose, all that he chose, and nothing but what he chose." The adoption of the New Curriculum in 1969, marking a major change in University's institutional history, was a significant step towards realizing President Wayland's vision. The curriculum was the result of a paper written by Ira Magaziner and Elliot Maxwell entitled "Draft of a Working Paper for Education at Brown University." The paper came out of a year-long Group Independent Study Project (GISP) involving 80 students and 15 professors. The group was inspired by student-initiated experimental schools, especially San Francisco State College, and sought ways to improve education for students at Brown. The philosophy they formed sought to "put students at the center of their education" and to "teach students how to think rather than just teaching facts."

The paper made a number of suggestions for improving education at Brown, including a new kind of interdisciplinary freshman course that would introduce new modes of inquiry and bring faculty from different fields together. Their goal was to transform the survey course, which traditionally sought to cover a large amount of basic material, into specialized courses that would introduce the important modes of inquiry used in different disciplines.

Following a student rally in support of reform, President Ray Heffner appointed the Special Committee on Curricular Philosophy with the task of developing specific reforms. These reforms, known as the Maeder Report (after the chair of the committee), were then brought to the faculty for a vote. On May 7, 1969, following a marathon meeting with 260 professors present, the New Curriculum was passed. Its key features included the following:

- Modes of Thought courses aimed at first-year students
- Interdisciplinary University courses
- Students could elect to take any course Satisfactory/No Credit
- Distribution requirements were dropped
- The University simplified grades to ABC/No Credit, eliminating pluses, minuses and D's. Furthermore, "No Credit" would not appear on external transcripts.

Except for the Modes of Thought courses, a key component of the reforms which have been discontinued, these elements of the New Curriculum are still in place.

Anniversaries

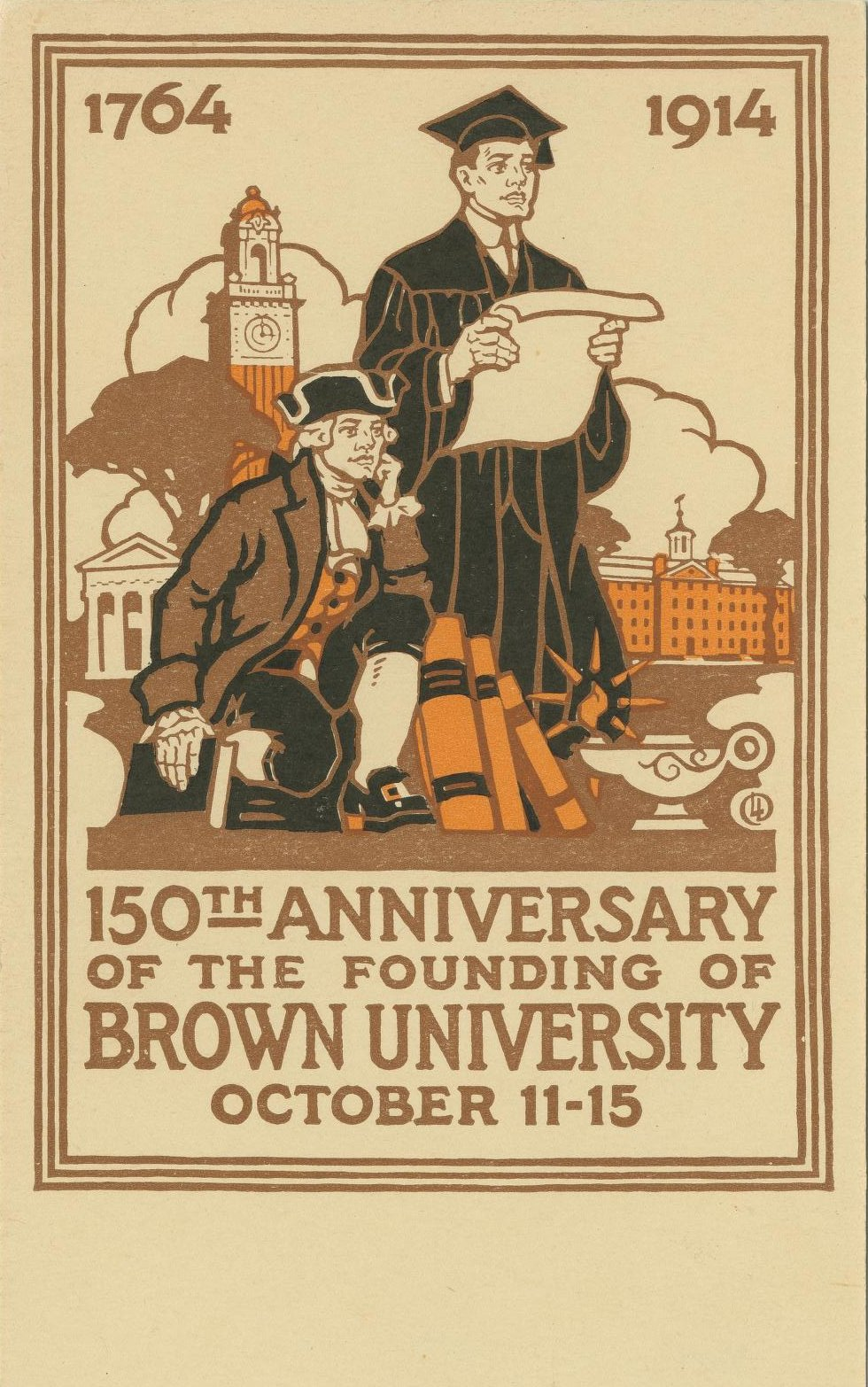
Brown celebrated its 150th year in 1914 ...

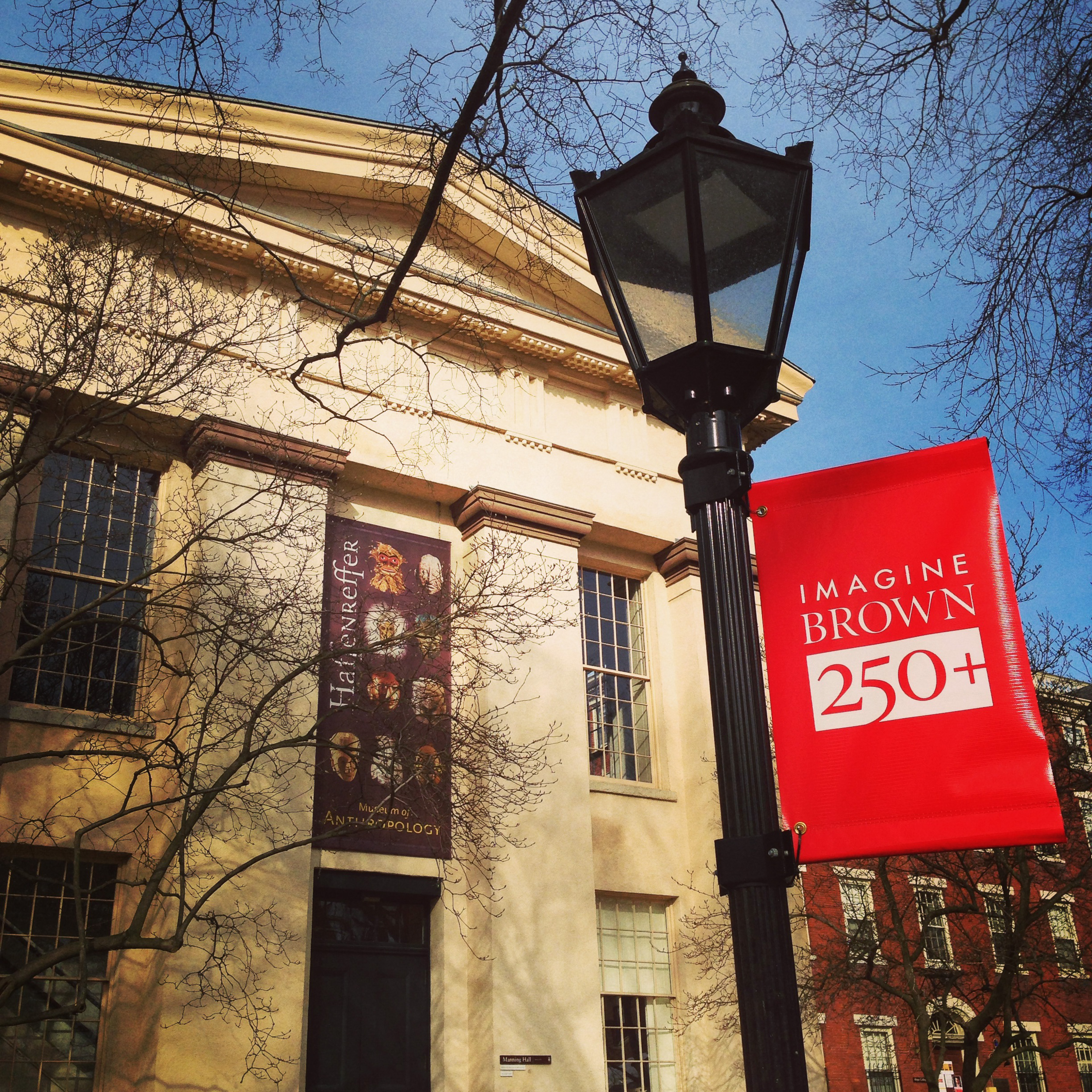
... and its 250th in 2014

Additionally, due to the school's proximity and close partnership with the Rhode Island School of Design (RISD), Brown students have the opportunity to take up to four courses at RISD and have the credit count towards a Brown degree. Likewise, RISD students can also take courses at Brown. Since the two campuses are effectively adjacent to each other, the two institutions often partner to provide both student bodies with services (such as the local Brown/RISD after-hours and downtown transportation shuttles). In July 2007 the two institutions announced the formation of the Brown/RISD Dual Degree Program, which allowed students to pursue an A.B. degree at Brown and a B.F.A. degree at RISD simultaneously, taking five years to complete this course of study. The first students in the new program matriculated in 2008.

As recently as 2006, there has been some debate on reintroducing plus/minus grading to the curriculum. Advocates argue that adding pluses and minuses would reduce grade inflation and allow professors to give more specific grades, while critics say that this plan would have no effect on grade inflation while increasing unnecessary competition among students and violating the principle of the New Curriculum. Ultimately, the addition of pluses and minuses to the grading system was voted down by the College Curriculum Council.

=== Medical School ===
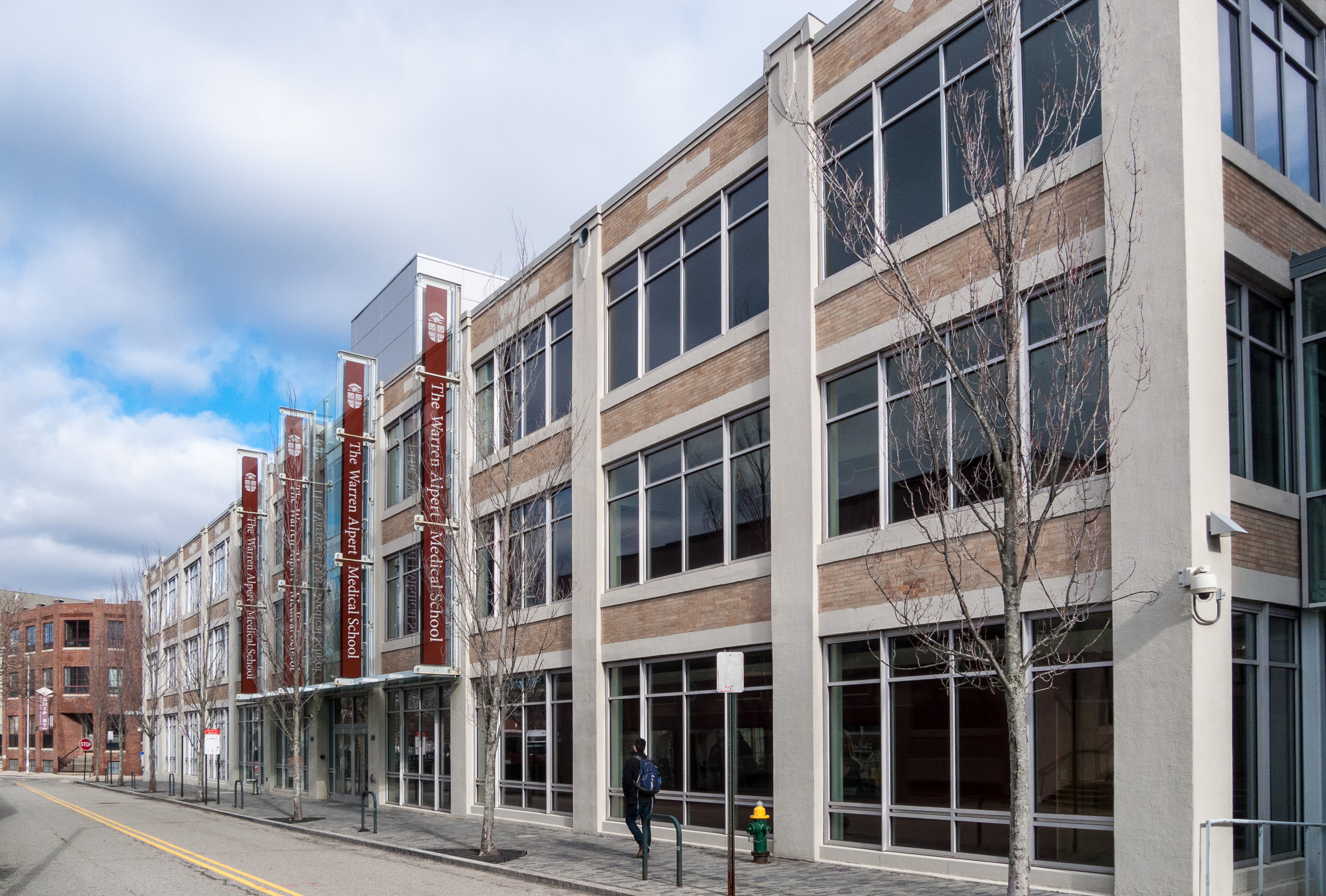
Brown's Alpert Medical School

In 1972, Brown re-established its medical school, which had been suspended since 1827. Brown's contemporary program in medicine, the program awarded its first degrees to a graduating class of 58 students in 1975. In 1991, the program was renamed Brown University School of Medicine and in 2000 again renamed Brown Medical School. In January 2007, entrepreneur Warren Alpert donated $100 million to Brown Medical School, tying Sidney Frank for the largest single monetary contribution ever made to the University. In recognition of the gift, Brown Medical School was renamed to The Warren Alpert Medical School of Brown University.

== 21st Century ==
=== Slavery and Justice ===
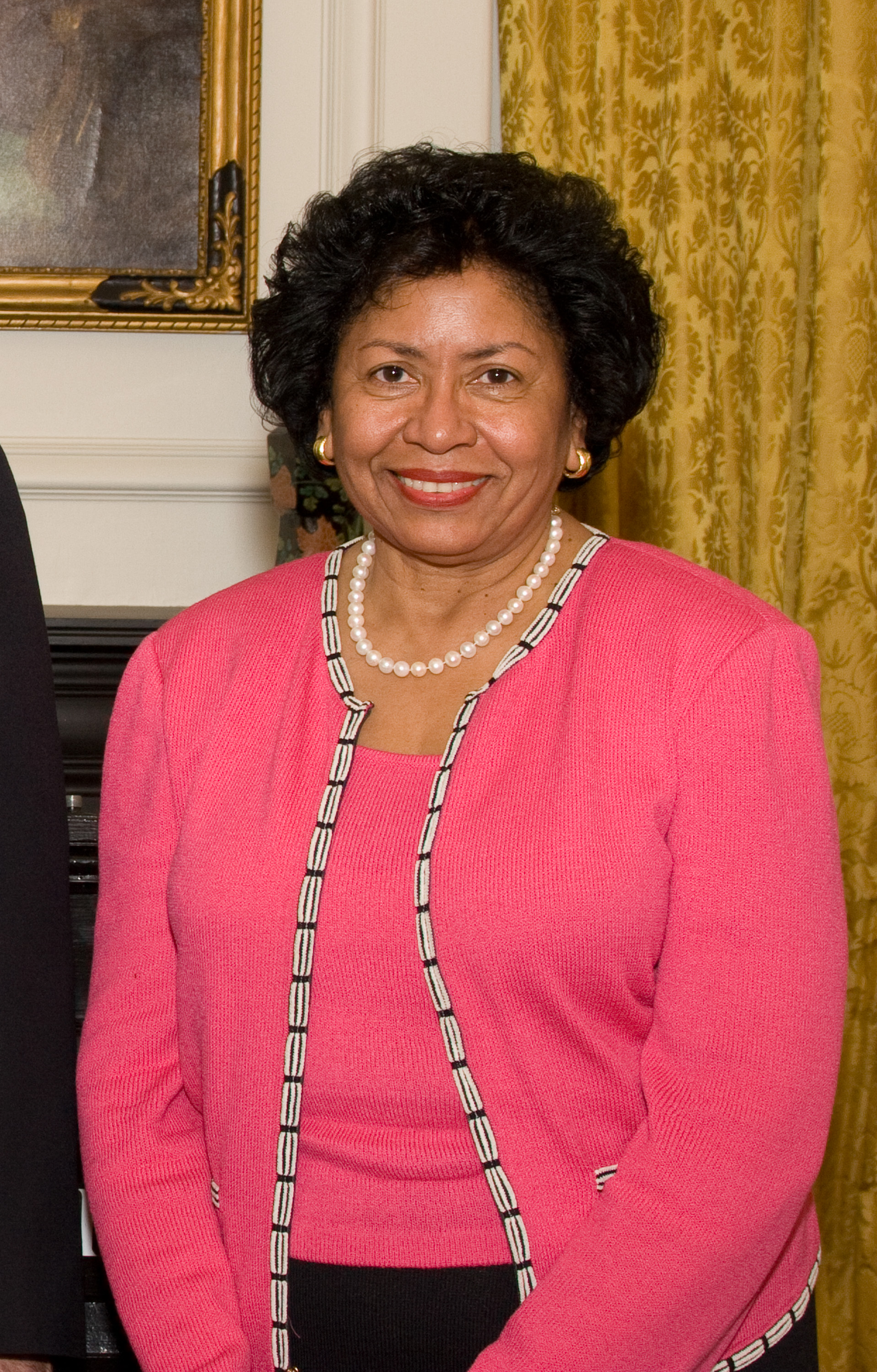
Brown's 18th president, Ruth Simmons, appointed the Steering Committee on Slavery and Justice

In 2003, then-Brown University President Ruth Simmons appointed the "Steering Committee on Slavery and Justice" which was composed of faculty members, university administrators and undergraduate and graduate students to investigate and prepare a report concerning the university’s "historical relationship to slavery and the transatlantic slave trade". The committee researched and gathered information on the history of Brown University, drawing on both published sources and historical archives. Members of the committee also sponsored more than thirty public programs, including lectures, panel discussions, forums, film screenings, and two international conferences exploring the experience of other societies and institutions which have "grappled with legacies of historical injustice". More than a hundred speakers were invited to speak at these events, including historian John Hope Franklin and survivor of modern slavery Beatrice Fernando. The final report, released by the committee in October 2006, detailed Brown University's connection to both the slave trade and abolitionism. The report began by noting the work conducted by the members of the committee, then detailing the university's connection to slavery and the slave trade, placing such historical developments into a wider context, analyzing the debate in the U.S. over reparations for slavery, and ended the report by noting that Simmons "did not ask the steering committee to try to resolve the debate, and [made it clear] that the committee would not determine whether or how Brown might pay monetary reparations" but instead informed them that their goal was to provide "factual information and critical perspectives” to enable Brown alumni (and the U.S. at large) to "discuss the historical, legal, political, and moral dimensions of the controversy [over slavery] in reasoned and intellectually rigorous ways". Members of the committee included several recommendations for Brown University to undertake in the report.

In February 2007, Brown University published an official response to the report, detailing the steps they would undertake in response to the committee's findings. One of these steps was the creation of a permanent endowment in the amount of $10 million to establish a "Fund for the Education of the Children of Providence". The endowment was stated "to be overseen by the Corporation of Brown University, and allocation of funds from the endowment will be determined by the University with input from the Superintendent of Providence Schools". Other steps included commissioning a revision of the official history of Brown University "so that it presents a more complete picture", undertaking steps to strengthen the university's Department of Africana Studies and relationships with Tougaloo College and other historically Black colleges and universities (HBCUs). In a press release, Simmons noted that "One of the clearest messages in the Slavery and Justice Report is that institutions of higher education must take a greater interest in the health of their local communities, especially Kindergarten through 12th-grade education. Lack of access to a good education, particularly for urban schoolchildren, is one of the most pervasive and pernicious social problems of our time. Colleges and universities are uniquely able to improve the quality of urban schools. Brown is committed to undertaking that work."

In March 2011, Brown University published an official update to their response to the Slavery and Justice Report, tracking the progress on each of the eleven steps proclaimed in the 2007 response. In the update, Brown University noted that progress was underway in regards to each of the steps proposed, and that the university had provided assistance to HBCUs affected by Hurricane Katrina. All records relating to the Steering Committee on Slavery and Justice are maintained at the John Carter Brown Library, the Rhode Island Historical Society and the Brown University Archives.

==== Slavery Memorial ====
Another part of the Response of Brown University to the Report of the Steering Committee on Slavery and Justice was the decision to build a memorial "to recognize [Brown's] relationship to the transatlantic trade and the importance of this traffic in the history of Rhode Island." To carry out the task of creating such a memorial, President Simmons appointed the Commission on Memorials in 2007, a 10-member committee of persons affiliated with Brown University and citizens from the Providence and Rhode Island area. This group published a report in 2009, entitled the Report of the Commission on Memorials that outlined its general plan and recommendations for the construction of Brown's Transatlantic Slave Trade Memorial. In this report, the committee listed

"several points of importance to the mission and purpose of commemoration projects. These include[d]: capturing the full extent of the history and the present-day implications of that history; addressing the lingering effects of slavery that manifest themselves in disparate social and economic conditions; reflecting the pervasiveness of the trade and its enduring impact; engaging ongoing debate and deliberation about human atrocities; helping people understand where they "fit" in this legacy; opening people's minds to the importance of confronting difficult questions; portraying this history as an American issue, challenge, and opportunity; addressing the ubiquitous nature of such trauma and the need to learn how to recover from such events; connecting to newer groups of immigrants coming into the country; [and] capturing individual stories connected to the legacy of slavery."

In 2014, the university erected a memorial on the Quiet Green to acknowledge the institution's connection to the trans-Atlantic slave trade and memorialize the Africans and African-Americans, both enslaved and free who were instrumental in the building of the school. The memorial, designed by contemporary sculptor, Martin Puryear, resembles a massive ball and chain, half submerged in the ground.

Brown's response to the Report of the Steering Committee on Slavery and Justice was published in the year marking the 200th anniversary of the abolition of the slave trade by the British Empire in the reign of King George III following a lengthy campaign by the Committee for the Abolition of the Slave Trade and the successor Society for the Abolition of the Slave Trade, as reported by the Oxford Today magazine and presented at Rhodes House in Oxford.

=== Expansion ===
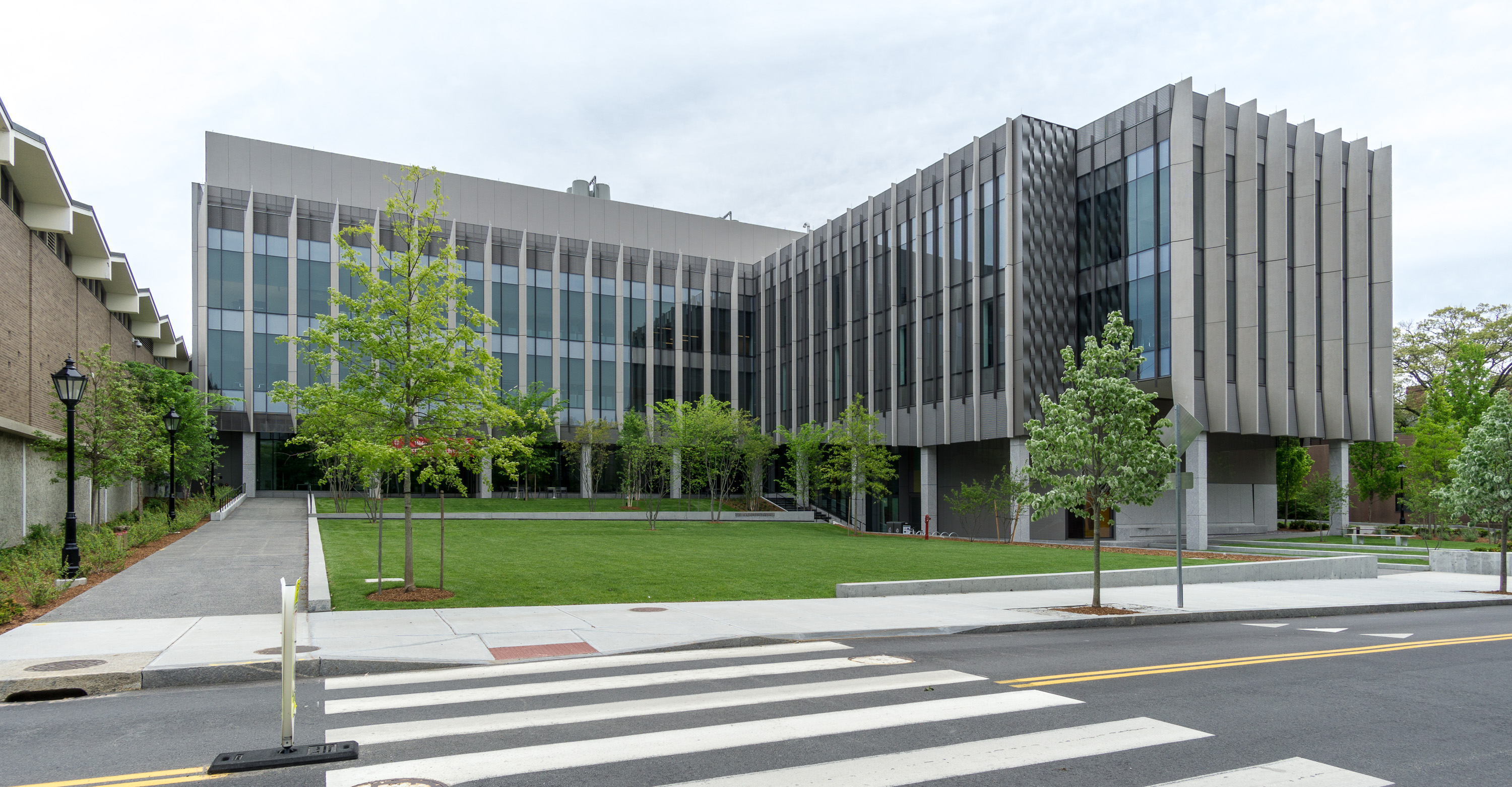
The Brown University School of Engineering was elevated to its current status in 2010

In the first two decades of the 21st century, Brown established two new divisions. In 2010, Brown established its division of engineering as a new school of engineering. In August 2011, Brown's Alpert Medical School opened a new campus in Providence's Jewelry District. In 2013, Brown transitioned the Alpert Medical School's Department of Community Health into an independent school of public health.

=== Funding freeze and agreement ===
In 2025, the second Trump administration threatened to freeze research funding to Brown University and launched an investigation into the university for Title VI violations, for "antisemitic" activity (citing responses to pro-Palestinian demonstrations by students during its commencement ceremonies in 2024) and use of diversity, equity, and inclusion (DEI) policies. In July 2025, the university reached an agreement with the Trump administration in order to restore funding. Under the agreement, the university is obligated to comply with federal policies dictated by executive orders, including prohibition of DEI, and withdrawing recognition of transgender people.

=== Mass shooting ===
On December 13, 2025, a mass shooting occurred near the Barus and Holley Engineering Building, killing two and injuring nine more.

== Presidents of Brown University ==
The current president of the University is Christina Hull Paxson. She is the 19th president of Brown University and succeeded Ruth J. Simmons, the first African American president of an Ivy League institution. According to a November 2007 poll by The Brown Daily Herald, Simmons enjoyed a more than 80% approval rating among Brown undergraduates.

== See also ==
- History of Providence, Rhode Island
- History of Rhode Island
- List of presidents of Brown University
- List of Brown University people
