= Separate Baptists =

18th-century Baptist movement in the United States

Separate Baptists are Evangelical Baptists with origins in separatism during the First Great Awakening of the 18th century in the United States. The main Separate Baptist leader was Isaac Backus. The Separate Baptists later became part of the mainstream American Baptists (Regular Baptists), centered in Philadelphia, Pennsylvania, and Rhode Island. Inspired by the passionate, revivalist preaching of Evangelical ministers like George Whitefield, they dissented from the American established churches and started to emphasize a personal connection with God and spiritually invigorating services, often being victims of religious intolerance.

== History ==
The Great Awakening was a religious revival and revitalization of piety among Christian churches in English-speaking countries. It swept through the American colonies between the 1730s and the 1770s. However, the revival served not only to invigorate the churches but also to divide them. The main denominations divided into Old Lights — holding a low view of the revivalism, and sometimes directly opposing it — and New Lights — who enthusiastically embraced it. Many New Lights felt that the old ways had allowed too many unconverted church members, and by the end of the 1740s some of the New Lights believed the established churches could not be reformed from within and withdrew from them. A favorite verse among these separatist New Lights was II Corinthians 6:17: "Come out from among them, and be ye separate." This led to them being called Separate. Three important preachers of the times were Gilbert Tennent (1703–65), Jonathan Edwards (1703–58), and George Whitefield (1714–70), who mostly influenced the formation of many Separate Baptists. The first identifiable congregation of Separate Baptists was formed in Boston, Massachusetts. Whitefield preached fervently in Boston in 1740. The main pastor of the Baptist church in Boston, being a Old Light Baptist, disapproved of the revival excitement, while several members approved of it and became discontented with the pastor's ministry. Later, they withdrew from the church and formed the Second Baptist Church of Boston in 1743.

A growing number of Separate Baptists began in New England. They were zealous in evangelism and held to heart-felt religion. The New England Separate Baptists, however, were never a distinct body from the Regular Baptists. The most prominent pastor was Isaac Backus (1724–1808) and the most prominent congregation was the First Baptist church of Middleborough, Massachusetts. Backus was raised a Congregationalist and became a Separate New Light Congregationalist pastor in 1748. After converting to Baptist views of Baptism, he and others established a Baptist congregation in 1756. Backus was very active in the fight for religious liberty in America. In the South, it would remain for the Separate Baptists to develop along distinct lines.

In 1745, Shubal Stearns (1706–71), a member of the Congregationalist church in Tolland, Connecticut, heard evangelist George Whitefield preach. Stearns was converted and adopted the Awakening's view of experience of grace and personal conversion. Stearns' church became involved in a controversy over the proper subjects of baptism in 1751. Soon Stearns rejected infant baptism and sought baptism at the hands of Wait Palmer, Baptist minister of Stonington, Connecticut. By March, Stearns was ordained into the ministry by Palmer and Joshua Morse, the pastor of New London, Connecticut. The next twenty years of Stearns' remarkable ministry was inextricably intertwined with the rise and expansion of these revivalist Baptists.

In 1754, Stearns moved south to Opequon, Virginia. He joined Daniel Marshall and wife Martha (Stearns' sister), who were already active in a Baptist church there. On November 22, 1755, Stearns and his party moved further south to Sandy Creek, in Guilford County, North Carolina. This party consisted of eight men and their wives, mostly relatives of Stearns. Stearns pastored at Sandy Creek until his death. From there, Separate Baptists spread in the South. The church quickly grew from 16 members to 606. Church members moved to other areas and started other churches. The Sandy Creek Baptist Association was established in 1758. Morgan Edwards, Baptist minister and historian contemporary with Stearns, recorded that, "in 17 years, [Sandy Creek] has spread its branches westward as far as the great river Mississippi; southward as far as Georgia; eastward to the sea and Chesopeck [sic] Bay; and northward to the waters of the Pottowmack [sic]; it, in 17 years, is become mother, grandmother, and great grandmother to 42 churches, from which sprang 125 ministers."

== Distinction between Regular and Separate Baptists ==
For a time, Separate Baptists distinguished themselves from Regular Baptists. Although, historians and scholars have noted that their differences are minor. According to Edwards, "These are called Separates, not because they withdrew from the Regular Baptists but because they have hitherto declined any union with them. The faith and order of both are the same, except some trivial matters not sufficient to support a distinction, but less a disunion; for both avow the Century-Confession and the annexed discipline." As Edward wrote, Separate Baptists were mostly in agreement with the Regulars and held similar beliefs. The main points of distinction between the two were their origin and style. Regular Baptist churches started from English immigrants and were primarily centered in Philadelphia, while Separate Baptists were a group of dissenters who left the established church in the South (Church of England) to start their own services. This dissent was invigorated after people were compelled by passionate, revivalist preachers such as George Whitefield, though not all Separate Baptist churches were the result of revivals. The Separate Baptists were more focused on a personal relationship with God and spiritual experiences, and their churches went through a phase of rapid growth in the South and specifically Virginia.

Another distinction made between the Separate Baptists and Regular Baptists was the number of ordinances and rites observed and customs practiced by the churches. The Separate Baptists had nine: Baptism, Holy Communion, Agape feast, laying on of hands, feet washing, anointing of the sick, the right hand of fellowship, the holy kiss, and infant dedication. Not every church practiced all nine of these, but most churches practiced more than the two ordinances generally held by the Regular Baptists — Baptism and the Lord's supper.

With the exception of the Separate Baptists in Christ, the denominational name Separate Baptist disappeared in many areas of the country with the formal and informal agreements of union between the Regular Baptists and Separate Baptists, beginning in Virginia in 1787, in the Carolinas in 1789, and in Kentucky in 1797 & 1801. As recorded by Benedict, the conclusion of the terms of union in Virginia stated, "...we are united, and desire hereafter, that the names Regular and Separate be buried in oblivion; and that from henceforth, we shall be known by the name of the United Baptist Churches, in Virginia."

Denominational bodies that can trace back to the original Separate New Light Baptists include the Southern Baptist Convention, the American Baptist Churches, the Separate Baptists in Christ, the General Association of Baptists, and some Primitive Baptist groups.

Separate Baptists are particularly visible in Kentucky, where a member of the denomination, Vernie McGaha of Russell Springs, served in the state senate.

== Religious persecution ==
Many Separate Baptists were victims of significant religious intolerance and persecution in the 18th century. Leaving the established churches and conducting services that were emotionally and spontaneously driven earned them a poor reputation amongst the Anglican Church. Morgan Edwards documented instances of persecution in various southern churches in great detail. Although outside Rhode Island the more mainstream Baptists also sometimes faced instances of religious intolerance, the Separate Baptists were more commonly the recipients of persecution because of their separatist origins, different style of preaching and evangelizing and Evangelical theology. Some types of persecution include physical assaults and legal repercussions, including imprisonment.

=== John Waller ===
One notable example of a Separate Baptist preacher who faced religious persecution is John Waller. Waller was an evangelist who established churches throughout the South in the late 18th century. He faced a powerful conversion into the revivalist teaching after spending his life as a professional gambler and being nicknamed "Swearing Jack." During his 35 years of ministry, Waller faced assaults such as being scourged, pulled away from the pulpit, beaten, and put into prison. In 1768, Waller was imprisoned with James Childs, James Reed, William Marsh, and Elijah Craig's older brother Lewis in the Fredericksburg jail for several weeks, for preaching without licenses from the established Anglican Church. In 1774, the convention of independent Baptists designated Elijah Craig and John Waller as apostles (missionaries) to evangelize north of the James River. Waller was highly regarded in Virginia and is remembered today for his efforts in the battle for religious liberty in Colonial America.
