= Isaac Backus =

American Baptist minister

The Reverend Isaac Backus
- Born: January 9, 1724; Yantic, Connecticut, British America
- Died: November 20, 1806 (aged 82); Middleborough, Massachusetts, U.S.

Isaac Backus (January 9, 1724 – November 20, 1806) was a leading Baptist minister from Connecticut during the era of the American Revolution who campaigned against state-established churches in New England.

== Early life ==
Backus was born in the village of Yantic, now part of the town of Norwich, Connecticut. His father Samuel died when Isaac was sixteen, and his mother was Elizabeth Tracy Brakus was left a widow to care for eleven children. She had had a religious conversion experience in 1721 and left a strong spiritual influence on her children, including Isaac. In 1740 she was sent to jail for refusing to pay taxes for religious reasons, and had another religious experience, saying she was "loosed and found Jesus in the midst of the furnace with me," until "the prison looked like a palace to me." She was released from prison, although she said she did not know why, it is possible her son-in-law Jabez Huntington paid the necessary taxes for her.

Backus was influenced by the Great Awakening and the works of Jonathan Edwards and George Whitefield. He was converted in 1741. For five years, he was a member of a Separatist Congregationalist church. In 1746, he became a preacher. He was ordained in 1748. Backus became a Baptist in 1751 when he became pastor of the Middleborough Baptist Church in Middleborough, Massachusetts. In An account of the life of Isaac Backus, completed to 1756, he provides genealogical information and a chronicle of events leading to his religious conversion.

In response to preaching of the Great Awakening, in 1741 Backus joined the Standing church in Norwich. The Norwich minister was distressed that the converts caused too much agitation and after a few years refused to invite itinerant New Lights, so in 1746 Backus and several other church members withdrew and formed a New Light church. In 1748 Backus became minister of a New Light church in Middleborough, Massachusetts; he continued his association with the New Lights until 1756, when he withdrew because of his opposition to infant baptism. He organized a Separate Baptist church in Middleborough and remained as minister there until his death.

== Career ==
In 1764, Isaac Backus joined John Brown, Nicholas Brown, William Ellery, Stephen Hopkins, James Manning, Ezra Stiles, Samuel Stillman, Morgan Edwards and several others as an original fellow or trustee for the chartering of the College in the English Colony of Rhode Island and Providence Plantations (the original name for Brown University), the first Baptist school of higher learning.

Backus published a large number of tracts and a 3-volume history of the Baptist denomination. His two major concerns are reflected in these works: unification of the Separate Baptists and the struggle against religious taxation as part of efforts to achieve religious freedom. Throughout his professional career Backus travelled extensively in New England, helping to organize churches and settle disputes among various Baptist groups. The Warren Baptist Association was established in 1767; Backus was a member of the Grievance Committee formed to work toward elimination of persecution by civil authorities. As an agent of the Committee he worked to keep the issue of separation of church and state before the general public; and in 1774 he travelled to Philadelphia with other Baptists to seek assistance from the First Continental Congress.

In his later years, Backus continued to be a spokesman for Baptists. He argued for ratification of the U.S. Constitution in 1790, convinced that in effect it stood for separation of church and state by prohibiting any religious test for officeholders. In 1796 he published the third volume of his History, and in 1803 an Abridgement. Backus died in Middleborough, November 20, 1806.

== American Revolutionary period and Religious Liberty ==
Considered a leading orator of the "pulpit of the American Revolution." Backus published a sermon in 1773 that articulated his desire for religious liberty and a separation of church and state called An Appeal to the Public for Religious Liberty, Against the Oppressions of the Present Day. In that book, Backus stated: "Now who can hear Christ declare, that his kingdom is, not of this world, and yet believe that this blending of church and state together can be pleasing to him?"

Isaac Backus’s advocacy for religious freedom was deeply influenced by the ideologies of Roger Williams and John Locke, pivotal figures who shaped his thinking. Williams' pioneering arguments for the separation of church and state in colonial America profoundly impacted Backus, embedding a strong opposition to religious establishments in his works. Additionally, John Locke's principles of individual rights and the social contract theory further enriched Backus’s theological arguments, emphasizing the intrinsic right to religious liberty. These influences are evident in Backus's persistent efforts to secure religious freedom through his writings and advocacy.

== Backus's support of the American Revolution ==
Glazier notes that Isaac Backus underwent an abrupt transformation from a critic of the Massachusetts State Legislature in 1774 to a staunch supporter of the American revolution in 1775. Prior to 1775, Backus had threatened to take up the issue of religious freedom with the Crown. In a famous letter to John Adams on Jan 19, 1774, Backus wrote:

"I hope, sir, that you will give proof both to the Court and to the world, that you regard the religious, as well as the civil rights of your countrymen; that so large number of a peaceable people, and so hearty friends to their country as any in the land, may not be forced to carry their complaints before those who would be glad to hear that the legislature of the Massachusetts deny to their fellow servants that liberty which they so earnestly insist upon for themselves."

Adams never responded directly to Backus's letter, but he made a number of disparaging comments about Backus in his journal. Adams later expressed his opinion that it would "be easier to change the working of the solar system than to change the Massachusetts church tax." Backus's veiled reference to George III above may have been a response to his learning of a successful petition by an Ashfield Church in 1771. Ashfield Baptists experienced difficulties beginning in 1765 when, due to the language regarding taxes in the Act of Incorporation of the Town of Ashfield, they were required to pay church taxes. According to Chileab Smith, the General Court in 1768 "impowered our oppressors to gather money of us or sell our lands for the payment of their minister, and the finishing of their meeting house." Baptist properties were auctioned by the Town in 1770. The Baptists sent a petition to King George III. In July 1771, the king responded. He indicated that he "was pleased with the advice of his Privy Council to declare his Disallowance of the said Act." Lands were restored to the plaintiffs. A similar case in South Carolina was reported to IB by Francis Pelot in a letter of Oct 3, 1770.

There is little evidence for Baptist support of the American Revolution prior to 1775. Of course, it would have made little political sense for any Baptist to publicly advocate American Independence before that date. Once war was declared, Backus (and many other Baptists) chose to support the Revolution. Backus quickly adapted his sermons to the needs of the times. On Sunday, April 23, 1775, following the battles of Concord and Lexington, he chose as his text 1 Chronicles 12:32: "And if the children of Issachar, which were men that had understanding of the times, to know what Israel ought to do; the heads of them were two hundred; and all their brethren were at their commandment." Baptist ministers became major supporters of the Revolutionary cause. Of the twenty-one Chaplains in George Washington's army, six Chaplains were Baptists. Isaac Backus remained a staunch supporter of American Independence for the rest of his life.

In 1778, Backus authored a historically important work entitled Government and Liberty Described and Ecclesiastical Tyranny Exposed of which a copy is held by the John Carter Brown Library at Brown.

== Backus and the Warren Association ==
Today, Backus is best known for his three-volume religious history of New England. But his activities on behalf of the Warren Association are equally significant.

In 1769, James Manning—pastor of the church in Warren and president of Rhode Island College [now Brown University] -- established an organization called the Warren Association to address church/state grievances: "Whereas complaints of oppressions, occasioned by a non-conformity to the religious establishment in New England, have been brought to this Association, and whereas the laws obtained for preventing and redressing such oppressions have, upon trial, been found insufficient (either through defect in the laws themselves, or iniquity in the execution thereof); and whereas humble remonstrances and petitions have not been duly regarded, but the same oppressive measures continued: This is to inform all the oppressed Baptists in New England that the Association of Warren, (in conjunction with the Western or Philadelphia Association) is determined to seek remedy for their brethren where a speedy and effectual one may be had. In order to pursue this resolution by petition and memorial, the following gentlemen are appointed to receive well attested grievances, to be by them transmitted to the Rev. Samuel Stillman of Boston; namely, Rev. Hezekiah Smith of Haverhill, Rev. Isaac Backus of Middleborough, Mr. Richard Montague of Sunderland, Rev. Joseph Meacham of Enfield, and Rev. Thomas Whitman of Groton in Connecticut."

With great reluctance, Isaac Backus accepted Manning's offer to serve as a representative on the Grievance Committee. He ended up serving as Grievance Committee Clerk and served longer than any other Association member. As Clerk, Backus was required to file and respond to all WA letters and reports.

Isaac Backus dedicated significant time to the Warren Association (WA) between 1770 and 1774. During this period, the association received an average of twelve letters and six reports monthly. Backus meticulously made copies of all correspondence and reports, distributing them to at least four other members of the Grievance Committee. The membership of the Warren Association was voluntary, and the association functioned purely in an advisory capacity. It had no authority to deny church membership or dismiss pastors. For example, a letter from Levi Maxcy dated September 4, 1772, was not acted upon by the Grievance Committee as it fell outside their jurisdiction. The annual reports of the association were typically concise, consisting of one page of well-composed text, written on heavy paper, and noted for their excellent penmanship. Each report was signed by the church's clerk, who wrote it, and the pastor, who approved it on behalf of the church.

WA reports follow a standard format: The first paragraph is a flowery (King James English) "Greetings" highlighting ways God had blessed their church during the past year. The second paragraph gives membership numbers; baptisms, deaths, transfers, and dismissals. The third paragraph details current church difficulties – leadership struggles and dismissals. Backus's WA files constitute one of the most complete records of church affairs in eighteenth century New England.

Glazier suggests that the most important document in the Yale collection is Chileab Smith's account of the persecution of the Baptists in Ashfield, Massachusetts. Backus's work for the Warren Association boosted his professional reputation. He was subsequently appointed a Trustee of Rhode Island College, represented Baptist interests to the Massachusetts State Legislature, and he represented Baptist interests to the Continental Congress in Philadelphia.

== During the ratification debate ==
Backus served as a delegate from Middleborough to the Massachusetts convention that ratified the United States Constitution in 1788. In a speech during the convention, Backus praised the constitution for its prohibition of religious tests for federal office holders:

Many appear to be much concerned about it [prohibition of religious tests], but nothing is more evident, both in reason, and in the holy scriptures, than that religion is ever a matter between God and individuals; and therefore no man or men can impose any religious test, without invading the essential prerogatives of our Lord Jesus Christ. Ministers first assumed this power under the Christian name; and then Constantine approved of the practice, when he adopted the profession of Christianity, as an engine of state policy. And let the history of all nations be searched, from that day to this, and it will appear that the imposing of religious tests hath been the greatest engine of tyranny in the world.

In the same speech Backus also praised the constitution for giving the federal government the power to tax and eventually (after twenty years) regulate or abolish the slave trade.

He voted in favor of ratification.

== Backus on Slavery ==
There is no record of Isaac Backus himself owning slaves, although his brother Elijah owned slaves and Isaac may have utilized slave labor. Isaac Backus failed to condemn African slavery in any of his earlier published writings. His friends and members of his extended family did own slaves. In eighteenth-century Norwich, it would have been common to hold African slaves as well as White indentured servants.

Backus's understanding of slavery included any form of bondage. It also encompassed any practice or institutional form that reduced individual freedom of choice which Backus compares to pedobaptism (infant baptism). For Backus, infant baptism was a form of slavery since the infant had little choice in the matter. Slavery, for Backus, is rooted in humanity's attraction to evil and the inability to resist sin. "All" are slaves. Backus was well aware that his redefinition of "slavery" was controversial (e. g. his speech to the 1788 Massachusetts Ratification Convention equating slavery, circumcision, and pedobaptism was given immediately following an intense floor debate on taxing the African slave trade).

Glazier suggests that Backus's ideas regarding slavery may have been influenced by his friendship with Stephen Hopkins (1707-1785). Hopkins—who served as governor of Rhode Island, chief justice of the Rhode Island Supreme Court, first chancellor of Providence College, and a signer of the Declaration of Independence—was an abolitionist, a sometime Quaker, a slaveholder, a slave trader, and a privateer. Stephen Hopkins owned at least seven slaves who are named in two wills: Adam, Bonner, Fibbo, Primus, Priamus, Prince and St. Jago. For multiple decades, Hopkins had resisted pressure and threats of expulsion from his Quaker 'brethren' to free his slaves. Like Backus, Hopkins was a self-made man with little formal education. As noted, Hopkins worked closely with Backus in the founding of Brown University, and he was Backus's most politically powerful and legally astute friend. It might, therefore, have been expedient for Backus to avoid condemning slavery. Backus did not speak out against slavery until well after Stephen Hopkins's death.

Backus traveled widely in the South and supported Baptist churches in the region. These churches sought his advice in their disputes with other Separatist churches and their struggles with Anglicanism. While Africans may not have been eligible for full membership in these Southern churches (they were eligible for membership in Backus's Middleborough church), Backus does not give a full account of racial compositions of the churches he visited. He does mention preaching to African American congregations.

When Backus published his famous pamphlet "Godliness Excludes Slavery" in 1785, slavery was a topic of intense national debate. In "Godliness Excludes Slavery" – which was primarily circulated among Baptists in Virginia and North Carolina – Backus addressed slavery as a "spiritual issue." He equated African slavery to being a "slave to one's sinful nature." He never addressed the "moral issue" of owning slaves. Isaac Backus did not openly condemn slavery until 1797.

While not condemning slavery, Backus did oppose the African slave trade. As a delegate from Middleborough to the Massachusetts convention that ratified the United States Constitution in 1788, Backus voted to ratify the Constitution which gave the federal government power to tax and (after twenty years) to regulate or abolish the slave trade.
