= United Baptist =

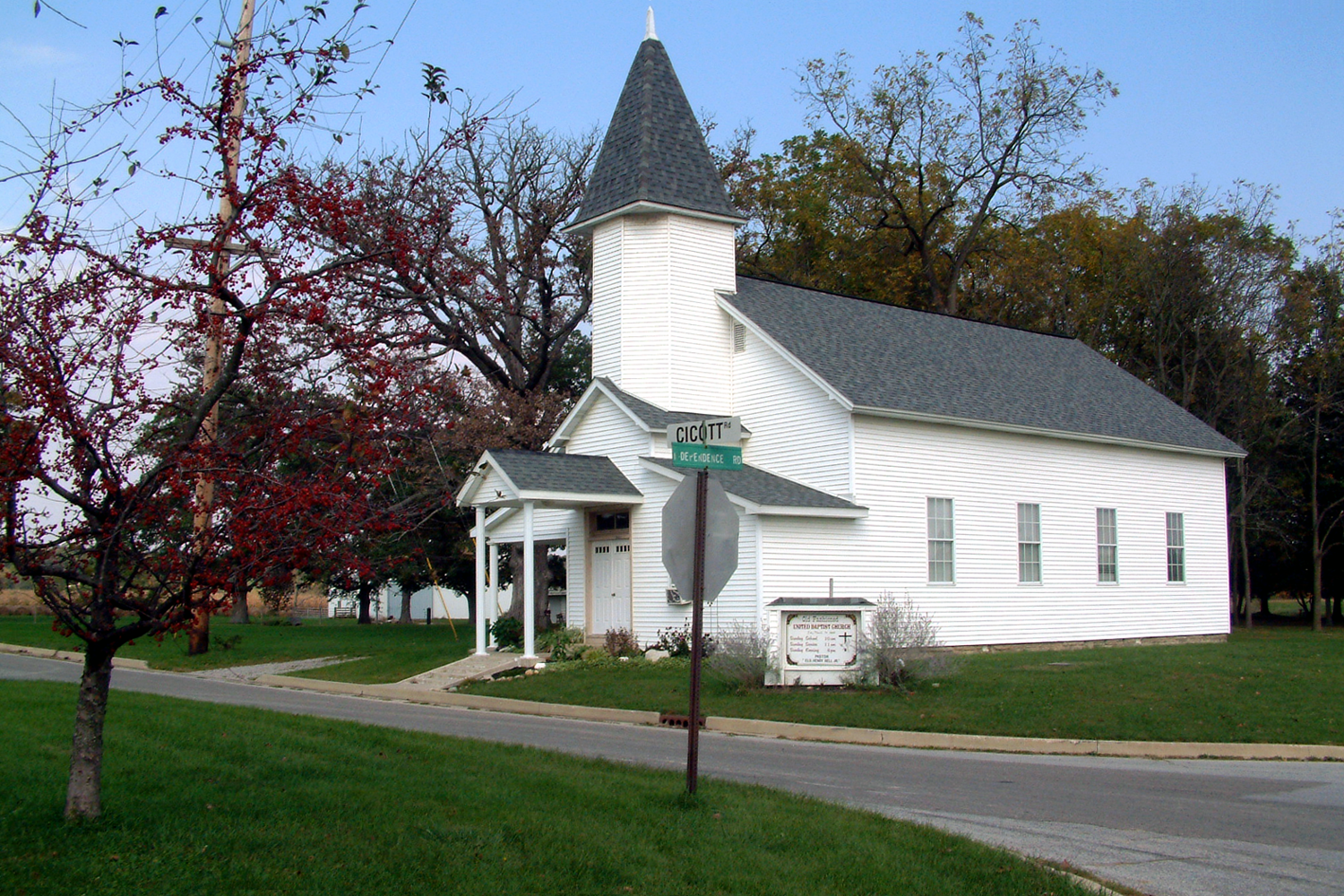
A United Baptist church in Independence, Indiana.

United Baptist is name of several diverse Baptist groups of Christianity in the United States and Canada.

== History ==
The name "United Baptist" appears to have arisen from two separate unions of Baptist groups: (1) the union of Regular Baptists and Separate Baptists in Kentucky, Virginia, and the Carolinas in the United States late in the 18th century and near the turn of the 19th century, and (2) the union of Regular Baptists and Free Baptists in the Maritime Provinces of Canada near the beginning of the 20th century. Many Baptists in the southern United States were called United Baptists, while most in the north were called Regular Baptists. Missionary Baptist bodies such as the Southern Baptist Convention, the American Baptist Association (ABA) and even some American Baptist Churches USA (ABCUSA) are descendants of the United Baptists. Churches in the ABCUSA retaining the name United Baptist are primarily in the northeast, especially Maine, and are products of the Regular/Free Baptist union. One local association of churches in the ABA maintained the "United Baptist" name into the mid-1990s. A number of churches in the United Baptist Convention of the Atlantic Provinces (now Convention of Atlantic Baptist Churches) continue to use the name United Baptist.

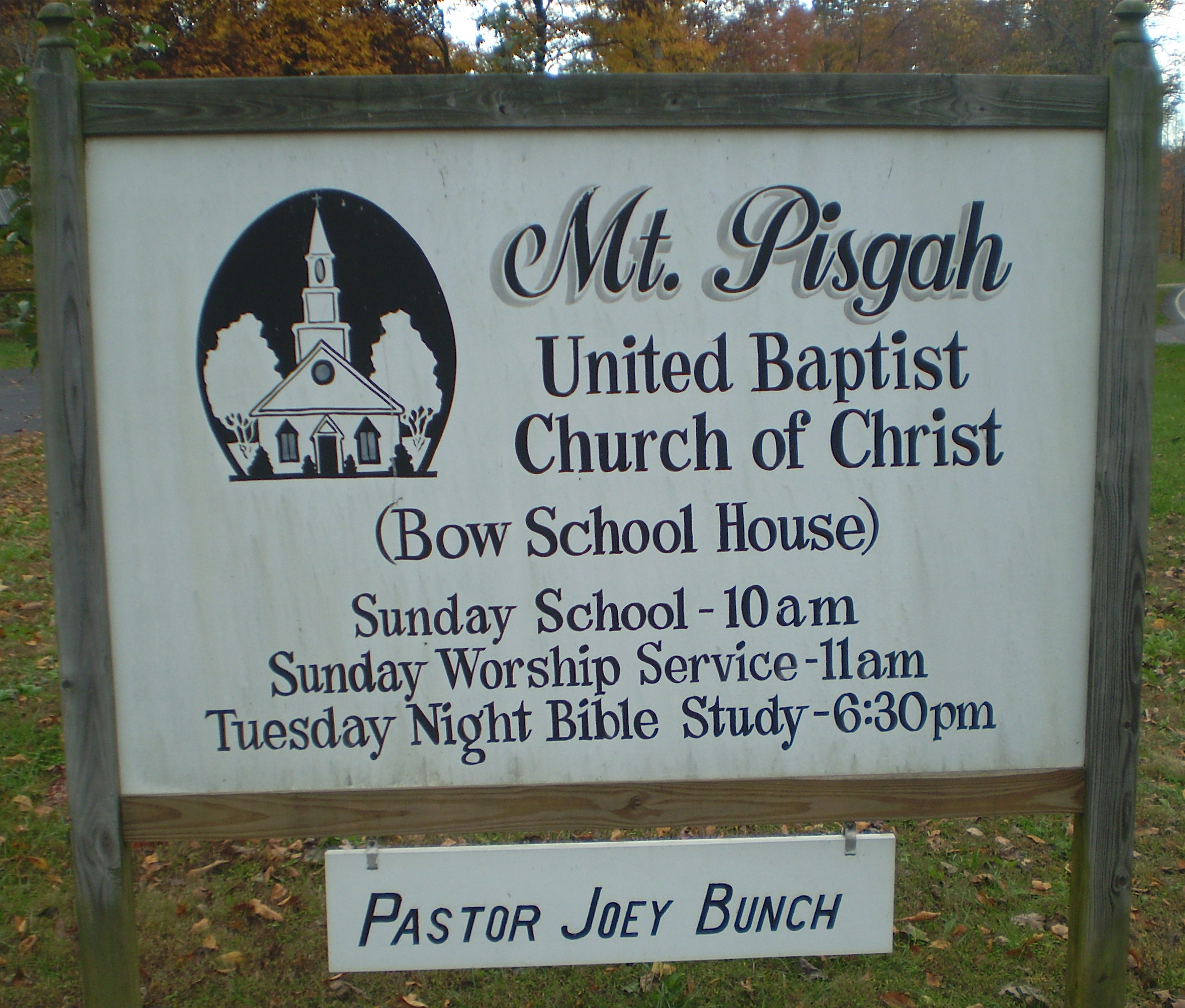
Sign in front of Mt. Pisgah United Baptist Church of Christ (Bow School House, Kentucky)

== Status ==
The most prominently recognizable United Baptists are the unaffiliated local associations of churches that have remained separate and distinct from affiliation with any national or general organizations. The Churches and Church Membership in the United States 1990 survey found over 54,000 members in 436 churches and 24 associations. Approximately 27 such associations exist in the United States, and fall roughly into three groups:

1. United Baptist (General), some Arminian-oriented, open communion bodies that fellowship with other bodies (that are moderately Calvinistic and closed communion). The common factor is style of worship;
2. United Baptist (Landmark), moderately Calvinistic closed communion bodies that once nominally cooperated with the Southern Baptist Convention;
3. United Baptist (Regular), primitivistic closed communion bodies that were early in opposition to Baptist missionary and educational enterprises, but that remained aloof from the Primitive Baptists. The largest concentration of these churches is in Kentucky.

The following associations are believed to exist in 2003:

- United Baptist (General)
  - Ancient Christian (IN, KY, OH)
  - Bethel (MO)
  - Bethlehem (WV)
  - Central Missouri (MO)
  - Centerpoint (OH)
  - First Love (IN)
  - Friendship (IN)
  - Kings River (OK, AR)
  - New Bethel (OH)
  - Ohio Valley (OH, WV)
  - Tri-State (IN, KY, OH)
  - Union (AR)
- United Baptist (Landmark)
  - Green River (KY)
  - South Concord (KY)
  - South Fork (KY) - Disbanded as of September 2013.
  - Stockton Valley (TN)
  - West Union (TN)
- United Baptist (Regular)
  - Blaine Union (KY)
  - Calvary (WV) - called "Regular United"
  - Cedar Springs (KY)
  - Iron Hill (KY, OH, WV)
  - Laurel River (KY)
  - Mt. Sion (WV, KY) - called "Regular United"
  - Mt. Zion (KY)
  - New Hope (KY)
  - Paint Union (KY, OH, IN)
  - Old Bethlehem (WV, OH)
  - Old Paint Union (KY, OH)
  - Old Tri-State Zion (KY)- no longer in existence
  - Original Old Paint Union (KY) - No longer in existence
  - Red Bird River (KY)
  - Town Creek (AL)- "United Baptists of the Primitive Faith and Order"
  - Tri-State Zion (KY)
  - United (KY)
  - Union Bethlehem (WV)-No longer in existence.
  - Wills Creek (AL) - "United Baptists of the Primitive Faith and Order"
  - Wills Creek (AL)
  - Old Zion (KY, WV, OH)

Old Paint Union dissolved, with two churches going into Tri-State Zion, and the other four going into Paint Union.

Union Bethlehem dissolved after a split occurred in Tri-State Zion and Union Bethlehem. Five churches from TSZ and two from Union Bethlehem formed Zion(Tris-State Zion). Union Bethlem was left with only four churches, so they dissolved that association, and went into Paint Union.

These three sub-groups of United Baptists reflect differences in benevolences, (i.e. Sunday School) historical affiliations (i.e. Landmark) and worship styles (i.e. a cappella vs. musical instruments).

- Three bodies nominally connected to the name United Baptist:
  - Convention of Atlantic Baptist Churches - a union of Free Baptists and Regular Baptists
  - United American Free Will Baptist Church
  - United American Free Will Baptist Conference

== Practice ==
The unaffiliated United Baptist associations differ from one another in their views on the atonement, eternal security, and prerequisites of communion. They are fairly consistent in avoiding general unions and conventions, observing the ordinance of feet washing, and preferring an itinerant and non-salaried ministry, ministers may only be men and hold their own jobs for living support, the church is supported by free will offerings and give to the minister free will offerings from church service. A majority of the churches tend to primitivism, including women remaining silent during business of the church and not wearing pants (though some of the women wear pants outside the church), rejecting a seminary trained ministry, and even instrumental music, (though some have pianos). They hold the old time ways in salvation, that people must be first convicted of their sins through old time preaching and be born again through repentance. They do not believe in the practice of "accepting" the Lord as personal Savior, since they salvation comes from God during repentance to his satisfaction—when God is fully satisfied he will give deliverance from sin (salvation) (e.g., Green River, Kentucky Association). True United Baptist only use natural water baptisms. Associations promote fellowship by "corresponding" with (sending representatives to) other associations that they deem to be of "like faith and order".
