= Morgan Edwards =

American religious historian and Baptist pastor

- Born: May 9, 1722; Trevethin parish, Pontypool, Wales
- Died: January 25, 1792 (aged 69); Pencader, New Castle County, Delaware

Academic background
- Education: Bristol College

Morgan Edwards (May 9, 1722 – January 25, 1792) was an American historian of religion and Baptist pastor. He was a trustee in the chartering of the College in the English Colony of Rhode Island and Providence Plantations, later named Brown University.

== Biography ==
Edwards was born in Trevethin parish, Pontypool, Wales, and attended Bristol College, after which he began preaching in 1738. He pastored several small Baptist churches in England for seven years, then moved to Ireland, where he pastored for nine years. In May 1761 he emigrated to the American colonies, and became pastor of the First Baptist Church in Philadelphia, Pennsylvania. He was one of the few Baptist clergyman to side with the Tories in the American Revolution.

Edwards was a friend to the Academy of Philadelphia, afterwards the University of Pennsylvania, which in 1769 honored him with an honorary Master of Arts.

Edwards resigned as pastor of the First Baptist Church in Philadelphia in 1771 and retired to Pencader Hundred, near Newark, Delaware where he lived until his death in 1795. His grave is located at the Mount Moriah Cemetery in Philadelphia, Pennsylvania.

== Brown University ==
In 1764, Edwards joined James Manning, Ezra Stiles, Isaac Backus, John Gano, Samuel Stillman, William Ellery, and former Royal Governors Stephen Hopkins and Samuel Ward and several others as an original trustee for the chartering of the College in the English Colony of Rhode Island and Providence Plantations (the former name for Brown University), the first Baptist college in the original Thirteen Colonies and one of the Ivy League universities. In 1766, the college authorized Edwards to travel to Europe to "solicit Benefactions for this Institution". During his year-and-a-half stay in the British Isles, Edwards secured funding from benefactors including Thomas Penn and Benjamin Franklin.

== Premillennialism ==
Edwards's eschatology was based on a literal interpretation of scripture. Because his view was premillennial, and he wrote in his 1788 book Millennium, Last Days Novelties of the first resurrection taking place with Christ in the air, he is referenced by dispensational premillennialists such as Tim LaHaye to support the view that a pretribulation rapture theology existed prior to John Nelson Darby (1800–1882).

== Personal life ==
His wife, formerly Mary Nunn of Cork, Ireland died in 1769.

== Works ==
Edwards was a Baptist historian. He wrote the first Baptist church manual in the United States titled "Customs of Primitive Churches". His major work, Materials Toward A History of the Baptists (1770) is an important source describing the Baptists in America. He later wrote a companion volume, Materials Toward A History of the Baptists in New Jersey (1792).

In his Materials for a History of the Baptists in Rhode Island, Edwards wrote: "The first mover [himself] for it [a Baptist college] in 1762 was laughed at as a projector of a thing impracticable. Nay, many of the Baptists themselves discouraged the design (prophesying evil to the churches in case it should take place) from an unhappy prejudice against learning."

- Morgan Edwards (1762). A Farewell Discourse [on Acts XX. 25, 26] delivered at the Baptist Meeting in Rye. Dublin.
- Morgan Edwards (1770). "Materials Towards a History of the Baptists in Pennsylvania". Philadelphia: Joseph Crukshank.
- Morgan Edwards (1772). "Materials Towards a History of the Baptists in Jersey". Philadelphia: Thomas Dobson.
- Morgan Edwards (1772). "Materials Towards a History of the Baptists in the Provinces of Maryland, Virginia, North Carolina, South Carolina, Georgia". South Carolina Digital Library.
- Morgan Edwards; Horatio Gates Jones (1885). "History of the Baptists in Delaware, Part One". The Pennsylvania Magazine of History and Biography. 9 (1): 45–61. JSTOR 20084689.
- Morgan Edwards (1885). "History of the Baptists in Delaware (concluded)". The Pennsylvania Magazine of History and Biography. 9 (2): 197–213. JSTOR 20084702.
