= Hopewell, New Jersey =

Borough in the United States

- Borough
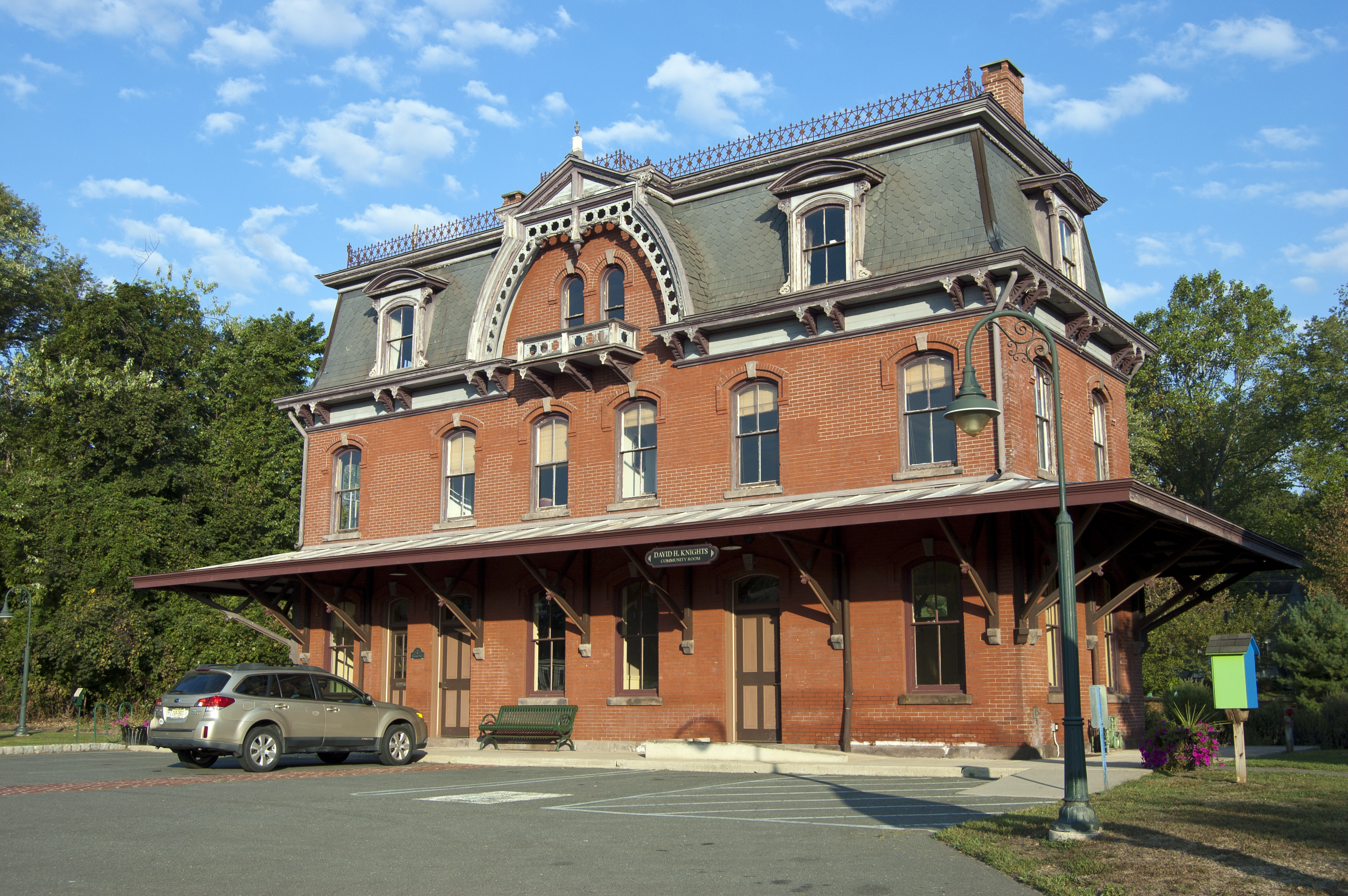
- Hopewell Station in 2019

- Seal

- Location of Hopewell in Mercer County highlighted in red (right). Inset map: Location of Mercer County in New Jersey highlighted in orange (left).

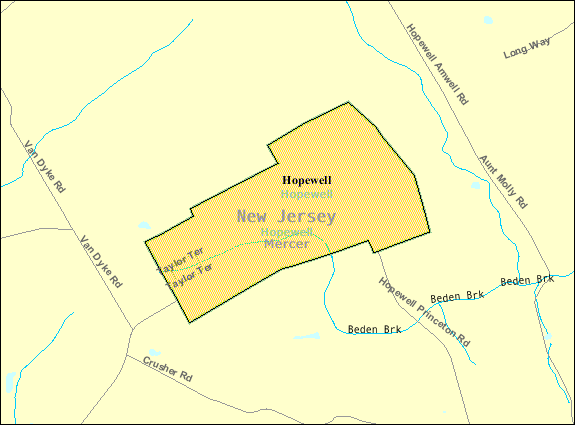
- Census Bureau map of Hopewell, New Jersey

- Location in Mercer County Location in New Jersey Location in the United States
- Coordinates: 40.389309°N 74.763799°W
- Country: United States
- State: New Jersey
- County: Mercer
- Incorporated: April 14, 1891

Government
  - Type: Borough
  - Body: Borough Council
  - Mayor: Ryan Kennedy(D)
  - Administrator: Michele Hovan

Area
  - Total: 0.72 sq mi (1.87 km^{2})
  - Land: 0.72 sq mi (1.87 km^{2})
  - Water: 0 sq mi (0.00 km^{2}) 0.00%
  - Rank: 528th of 565 in state 12th of 12 in county
- Elevation: 197 ft (60 m)

Population (2020)
  - Total: 1,918
  - Estimate (2023): 1,894
  - Rank: 489th of 565 in state 12th of 12 in county
  - Density: 2,650.4/sq mi (1,023.3/km^{2})
  - Rank: 242nd of 565 in state 4th of 12 in county
- Time zone: UTC−05:00 (Eastern (EST))
  - Summer (DST): UTC−04:00 (Eastern (EDT))
- ZIP Code: 08525
- Area code: 609
- FIPS code: 3402133150
- GNIS feature ID: 885260
- Website: www.hopewellboro-nj.us

Hopewell is a borough in Mercer County, in the U.S. state of New Jersey. Centrally located within the Raritan Valley region, this historical settlement (and its neighboring township of the same name) is an exurban commuter suburb of New York City in the New York metropolitan area as defined by the United States Census Bureau. As of the 2020 United States census, the borough's population was 1,918, a decrease of 4 (−0.2%) from the 2010 census count of 1,922, which in turn had reflected a decline of 113 (−5.6%) from the 2,035 counted at the 2000 census.

Hopewell was incorporated as by the New Jersey Legislature on April 14, 1891, from portions of Hopewell Township, based on the results of a referendum held on March 21, 1891. Additional portions of Hopewell Township were annexed in 1915 and the borough was reincorporated in 1924.

== History ==
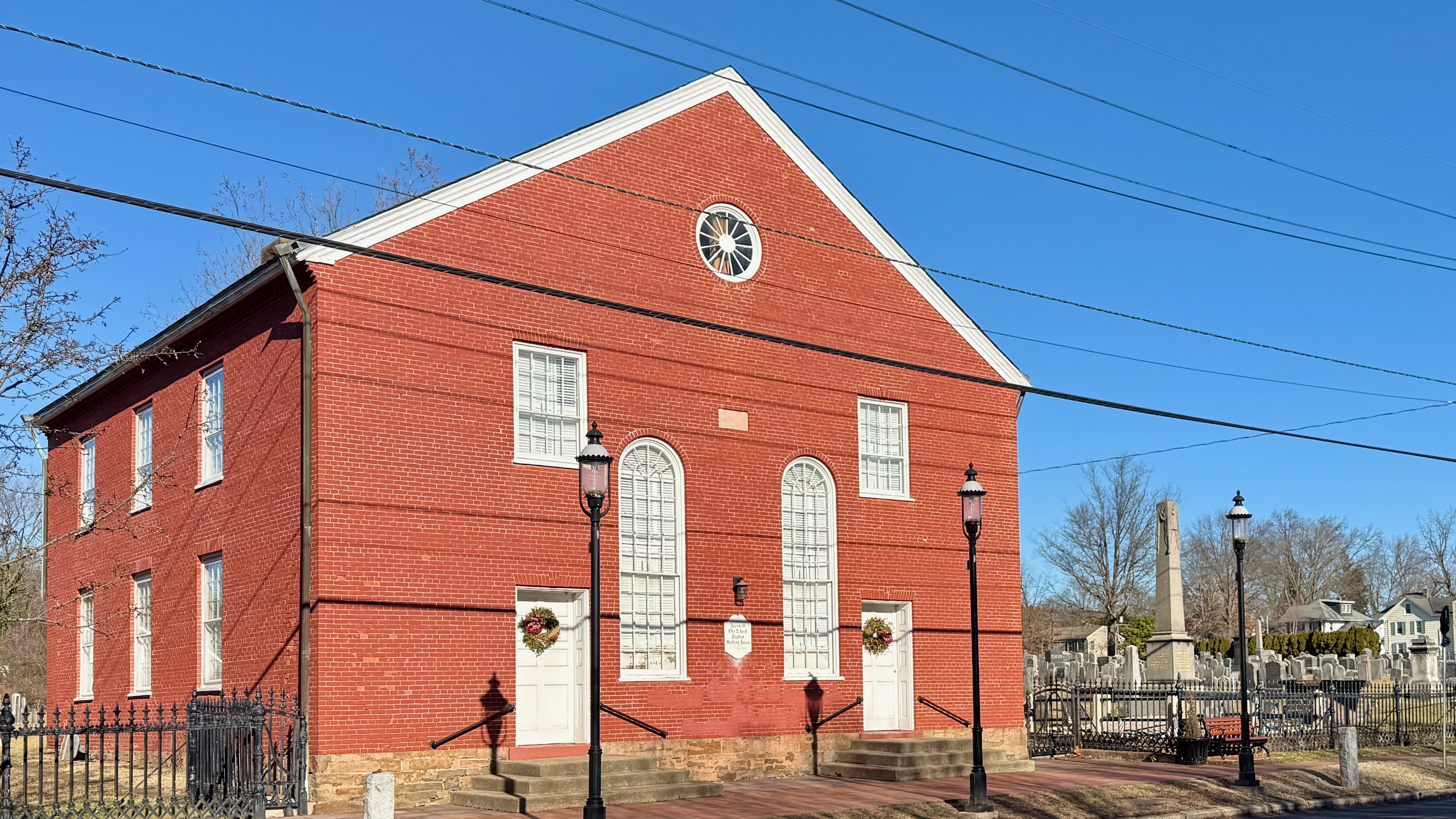
The Old School Baptist Church and Cemetery of Hopewell

=== Colonial era ===
The Lenape tribe of Native Americans were the original inhabitants of the area that would later become Hopewell. The first Colonial influence in Hopewell by European settlers was the purchase of a 30,000-acre (120 km^{2}) tract of land by Daniel Coxe a Royal British governor of West Jersey, in the latter half of the 17th century. All land in Hopewell can be traced back to this purchase. In 1691 Coxe, transferred his land to a company called The West Jersey Society of England, who intended to sell the land. The society appointed an agent, Thomas Revell, to preside over the land and sell it to prospective buyers. Revell then attracted settlers from New England, Long Island, and New Jersey falsely claiming that the land was fertile, and tame. However, the families that arrived in Hopewell only found vast stretches of wilderness. The first settler in Hopewell Valley was Thomas Tindall who on November 10, 1699, bought a 300-acre (1.2 km^{2}) tract of land from The West Jersey Society of England through Revell, for "ten pounds per hundred acres". Other early settlers in Hopewell are said to be the Stouts, who immigrated from Holmdel to Hopewell in 1706, including Jonathan Stout, who had hunted in the area together with the Lenape. Perhaps the first conflict between colonists in Hopewell was the dispute between Revell and the early inhabitants of Hopewell, who realized that their deeds were worthless due to Revell's false claims. Fifty settlers then organized a class action lawsuit against Revell and the West Jersey Society. A lengthy trial was held in Burlington and the court ultimately ruled against the settlers, who were forced to repurchase their land or relocate. Many settlers weren't able to repay and moved north into North Jersey and New York.

On April 23, 1715, the settlers who stayed in Hopewell, most notably the Stout family, organized the Old School Baptist Church, and what is now known as Hopewell was then referred to as "Baptist Meetinghouse". One of the most valued members of the meeting house was Declaration of Independence signer John Hart who in 1740 purchased 193 acres (0.78 km^{2}) of land in the north of current day Hopewell, and in 1747 as a sign of Hart's devotion to the Church, donated a plot of his land to the Baptists. The next year the Baptists made good use of this land and in 1748 erected their Old School Baptist Church meeting house on West Broad Street. The meeting house brought in Baptists from miles around to Hopewell and encouraged Hopewell's early growth.

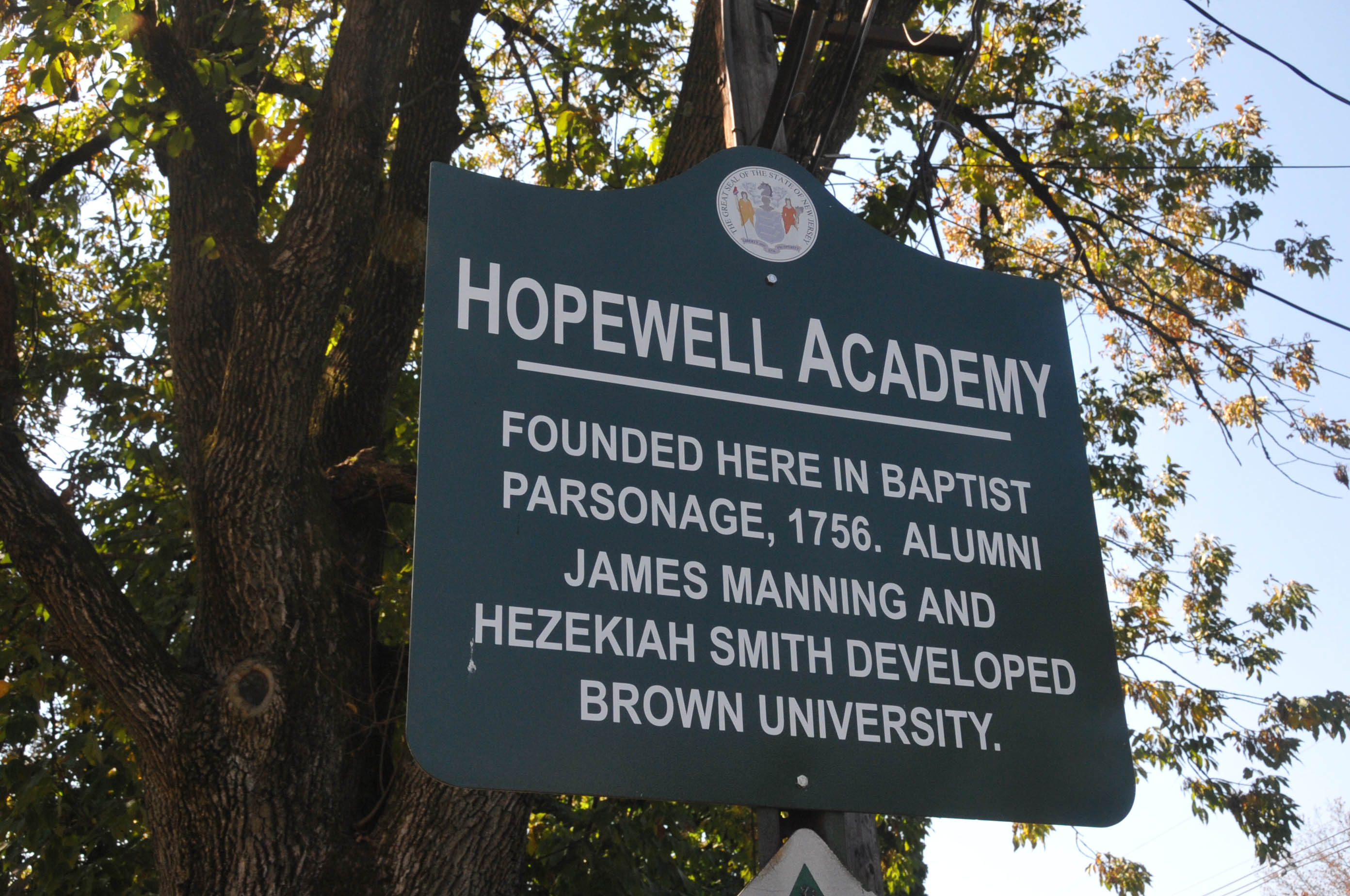

Numerous lumber mills were established in and around Hopewell at this time to process the lumber that was generated from the clearing of forests for farms.

In 1756, Isaac Eaton the first pastor of the Old School Baptist Church established the Hopewell Academy. One of his students, James Manning, would go on to establish Brown University in 1765.

=== Frog war ===
The first railroad to reach Hopewell was the Mercer and Somerset Railway, which was backed by the Pennsylvania Railroad. It was created largely to protect the monopoly the Pennsylvania Railroad had on New Jersey, by cutting off the first separately owned railroad in New Jersey, the Delaware and Bound Brook Railroad, by being built in the way of it. It was completed in 1874. The Delaware and Bound Brook reached Hopewell in 1876, but the railroad had to cross the Mercer and Somerset's track just to the northwest of Hopewell. A dispute occurred at the crossing, known as a frog, and escalated into each company parking locomotives over the crossing to prevent the other company from moving trains over it. Eventually, militia had to be called in to keep the peace, and the Delaware and Bound Brook prevailed. Soon after the Frog War the Mercer and Somerset was liquidated having failed at its purpose. Some of the abandoned right of way for the Mercer and Somerset in Hopewell became Model Avenue. The Delaware and Bound Brook was leased by the Philadelphia and Reading in 1879 for 999 years and has become the CSX Trenton Line and is still in use today. The Frog is also what gives Hopewell Elementary school its mascot, "Freddy the Frog" in honor of the Hopewell frog war.

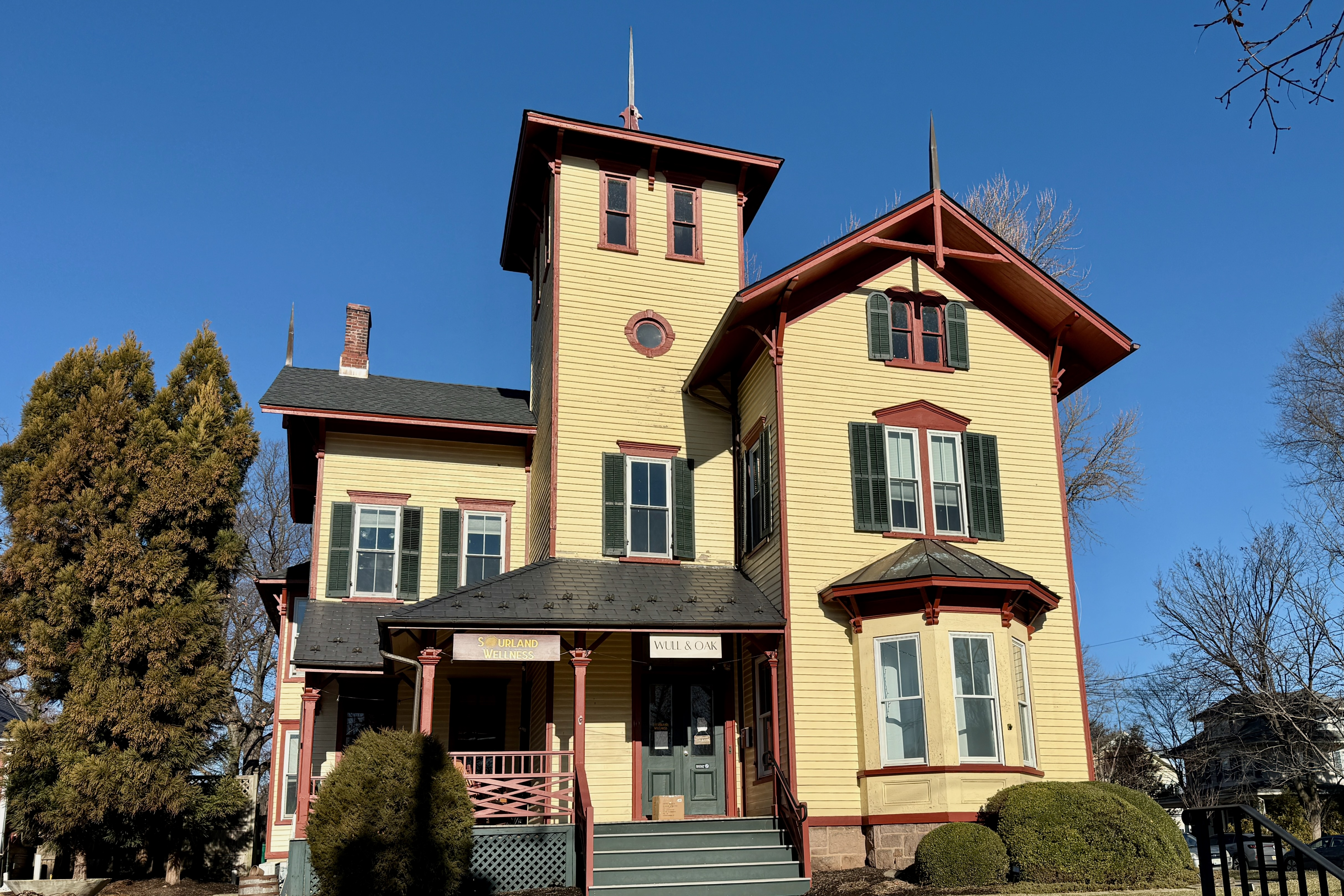
Historic Italianate house in Downtown Hopewell, now home to several businesses

=== The Hopewell Herald ===
The main source of news for Hopewell Township prior to the 1960s was the Hopewell Herald, which was owned, operated, and published by the Savidge family of Hopewell.

== Geography ==
According to the United States Census Bureau, the borough had a total area of 0.72 square miles (1.87 km^{2}), all of which was land.

The borough is an independent municipality surrounded entirely by Hopewell Township, making it part one of 21 pairs of "doughnut towns" in the state, where one municipality entirely surrounds another.

== Demographics ==
Historical population
| Census | Pop. | Note | %± |
|---|---|---|---|
| 1900 | 980 | | — |
| 1910 | 1,073 | | 9.5% |
| 1920 | 1,339 | | 24.8% |
| 1930 | 1,467 | | 9.6% |
| 1940 | 1,678 | | 14.4% |
| 1950 | 1,869 | | 11.4% |
| 1960 | 1,928 | | 3.2% |
| 1970 | 2,271 | | 17.8% |
| 1980 | 2,001 | | −11.9% |
| 1990 | 1,968 | | −1.6% |
| 2000 | 2,035 | | 3.4% |
| 2010 | 1,922 | | −5.6% |
| 2020 | 1,918 | | −0.2% |
| 2023 (est.) | 1,894 | ▼ | −1.3% |
Population sources:1900–1920 1900–1910 1910–1930; 1940–2000 2000; 2010 2020

=== 2020 census ===
The 2020 United States census counted 1,918 people in Hopewell Borough, representing a slight decrease from the 1,922 residents recorded in 2010. The population density was approximately 2,729.0 per square mile (1,053.5/km²). The borough contained 828 housing units, with an average density of 1,183 housing units per square mile (457/km²).

The racial makeup of the borough was 88.90% White, 1.70% Black or African American, 0.40% Native American, 1.40% Asian, 0.10% Pacific Islander, 0.90% from other races, and 6.70% from two or more races. Hispanic or Latino of any race were 4.40% of the population.

Of the 787 households, 30.4% had children under the age of 18; 53.7% were married couples living together; 26.7% had a female householder with no husband present. Of all households, 26.4% were made up of individuals, and 10.7% had someone living alone who was 65 years of age or older.

The age distribution was as follows: 21.2% were under the age of 18, 6.8% from 18 to 24, 22.8% from 25 to 44, 31.2% from 45 to 64, and 18.0% who were 65 years of age or older. The median age for both sexes was approximately 44.6 years.

=== 2010 census ===
The 2010 United States census counted 1,922 people, 778 households, and 532 families in the borough. The population density was 2,735.2 per square mile (1,056.1/km^{2}). There were 817 housing units at an average density of 1,162.7 per square mile (448.9/km^{2}). The racial makeup was 95.06% (1,827) White, 1.51% (29) Black or African American, 0.10% (2) Native American, 0.68% (13) Asian, 0.05% (1) Pacific Islander, 1.51% (29) from other races, and 1.09% (21) from two or more races. Hispanic or Latino of any race were 3.69% (71) of the population.

Of the 778 households, 33.5% had children under the age of 18; 54.6% were married couples living together; 10.9% had a female householder with no husband present and 31.6% were non-families. Of all households, 25.4% were made up of individuals and 7.3% had someone living alone who was 65 years of age or older. The average household size was 2.47 and the average family size was 3.00.

24.0% of the population were under the age of 18, 6.4% from 18 to 24, 22.2% from 25 to 44, 36.3% from 45 to 64, and 11.1% who were 65 years of age or older. The median age was 42.8 years. For every 100 females, the population had 91.8 males. For every 100 females ages 18 and older there were 87.7 males.

The Census Bureau's 2006–2010 American Community Survey showed that (in 2010 inflation-adjusted dollars) median household income was $105,417 (with a margin of error of +/− $8,866) and the median family income was $125,066 (+/− $15,420). Males had a median income of $91,375 (+/− $14,302) versus $55,357 (+/− $11,473) for females. The per capita income for the borough was $50,910 (+/− $5,465). About none of families and 0.5% of the population were below the poverty line, including none of those under age 18 and none of those age 65 or over.

=== 2000 census ===
As of the 2000 United States census there were 2,035 people, 813 households, and 561 families residing in the borough. The population density was 2,963.7 inhabitants per square mile (1,144.3/km^{2}). There were 836 housing units at an average density of 1,217.5 per square mile (470.1/km^{2}). The racial makeup of the borough was 95.43% White, 1.08% African American, 0.49% Native American, 0.98% Asian, 1.23% from other races, and 0.79% from two or more races. Hispanic or Latino of any race were 2.31% of the population.

There were 813 households, out of which 36.2% had children under the age of 18 living with them, 55.0% were married couples living together, 11.8% had a female householder with no husband present, and 30.9% were non-families. 25.1% of all households were made up of individuals, and 8.6% had someone living alone who was 65 years of age or older. The average household size was 2.50 and the average family size was 3.01.

In the borough, the population was spread out, with 26.1% under the age of 18, 4.7% from 18 to 24, 30.7% from 25 to 44, 27.9% from 45 to 64, and 10.6% who were 65 years of age or older. The median age was 40 years. For every 100 females, there were 94.0 males. For every 100 females age 18 and over, there were 89.3 males.

The median income for a household in the borough was $77,270, and the median income for a family was $91,205. Males had a median income of $52,656 versus $47,315 for females. The per capita income for the borough was $38,413. None of the families and 2.1% of the population were living below the poverty line, including no under eighteens and 5.2% of those over 64.

== Arts and culture ==
The Hopewell Museum documents life in the borough, with many artifacts collected from area residents.

== Government ==
=== Local government ===
Hopewell is governed under the borough form of New Jersey municipal government, which is used in 218 municipalities (of the 564) statewide, making it the most common form of government in New Jersey. The governing body is comprised of the mayor and the borough council, with all positions elected at-large on a partisan basis as part of the November general election. The mayor is elected directly by the voters to a four-year term of office. The borough council includes six members elected to serve three-year terms on a staggered basis, with two seats coming up for election each year in a three-year cycle. The borough form of government used by Hopewell is a "weak mayor / strong council" government in which council members act as the legislative body with the mayor presiding at meetings and voting only in the event of a tie. The mayor can veto ordinances subject to an override by a two-thirds majority vote of the council. The mayor makes committee and liaison assignments for council members, and most appointments are made by the mayor with the advice and consent of the council. All legislative powers of the Borough of Hopewell are exercised by the borough council in the form of a resolution, ordinance or proclamation.

As of 2023, the mayor of Hopewell is Democrat Paul Anzano, whose term expires December 31, 2023. Members of the borough council are Council President Charles Schuyler "Sky" Morehouse (R, 2023), Ryan Kennedy (D, 2023), David Mackie (D, 2025), Samara McAuliffe (D, 2024), Debra Stuhler (D, 2024) and Krista Weaver (D, 2025).

==== Public library ====
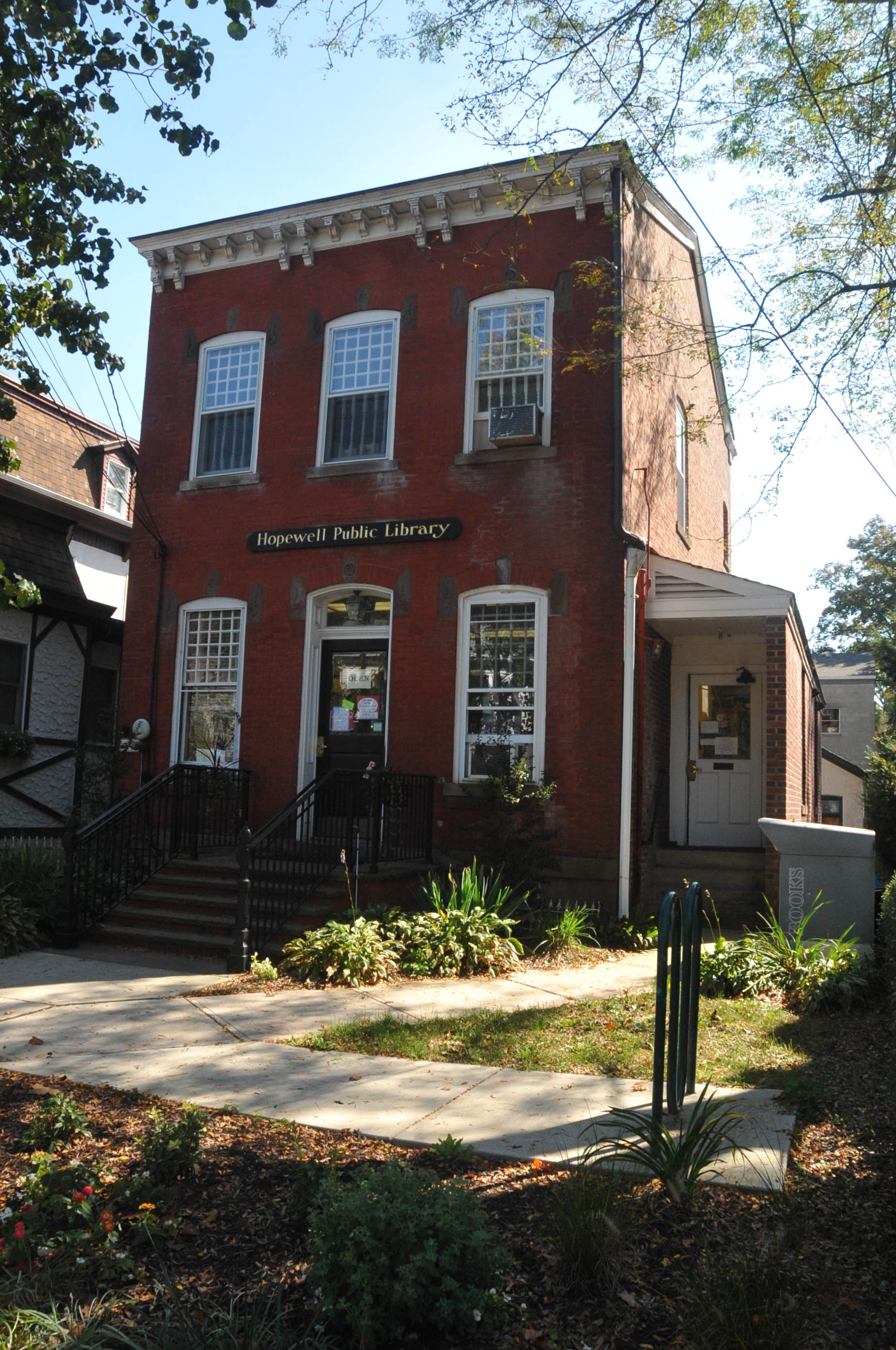
Hopewell Public Library

The Hopewell Public Library was founded March 14, 1914, and was originally located at Broad and Mercer Streets in an old harness shop. The Hopewell Post Office had replaced the old bank building in 1915 and the Hopewell Public Library moved to its current location in the old Hopewell National Bank building in 1965.

=== Federal, state and county representation ===
Hopewell Borough is located in the 12th Congressional District and is part of New Jersey's 15th state legislative district.

For the 119th United States Congress, New Jersey's 12th congressional district is represented by Bonnie Watson Coleman (D, Ewing Township). New Jersey is represented in the United States Senate by Democrats Cory Booker (Newark, term ends 2027) and Andy Kim (Moorestown, term ends 2031).

For the 2026–2027 session, the 15th legislative district of the New Jersey Legislature is represented in the State Senate by Shirley Turner (D, Lawrence Township) and in the General Assembly by Verlina Reynolds-Jackson (D, Trenton) and Anthony Verrelli (D, Hopewell Township).

Mercer County is governed by a County Executive who oversees the day-to-day operations of the county and by a seven-member Board of County Commissioners that acts in a legislative capacity, setting policy. All officials are chosen at-large in partisan elections, with the executive serving a four-year term of office while the commissioners serve three-year terms of office on a staggered basis, with either two or three seats up for election each year as part of the November general election. As of 2025, the County Executive is Daniel R. Benson (D, Hamilton Township) whose term of office ends December 31, 2027. Mercer County's Commissioners are:

Lucylle R. S. Walter (D, Ewing Township, 2026), Chair John A. Cimino (D, Hamilton Township, 2026), Samuel T. Frisby Sr. (D, Trenton, 2027), Cathleen M. Lewis (D, Lawrence Township, 2025), Vice Chair Kristin L. McLaughlin (D, Hopewell Township, 2027), Nina D. Melker (D, Hamilton Township, 2025) and Terrance Stokes (D, Ewing Township, 2027).

Mercer County's constitutional officers are: Clerk Paula Sollami-Covello (D, Lawrence Township, 2025), Sheriff John A. Kemler (D, Hamilton Township, 2026) and Surrogate Diane Gerofsky (D, Lawrence Township, 2026).

=== Politics ===
As of March 2011, there were a total of 1,473 registered voters in Hopewell Borough, of which 664 (45.1%) were registered as Democrats, 264 (17.9%) were registered as Republicans and 544 (36.9%) were registered as Unaffiliated. There was one voter registered to the Green Party.

United States presidential election results for Hopewell
| Year | Republican | | Democratic | | Third party(ies) | |
| Year | No. | % | No. | % | No. | % |
|---|---|---|---|---|---|---|
| 2024 | 240 | 19.29% | 985 | 79.18% | 19 | 1.53% |
| 2020 | 245 | 18.52% | 1,060 | 80.12% | 18 | 1.36% |
| 2016 | 274 | 22.55% | 879 | 72.35% | 62 | 5.10% |
| 2012 | 313 | 27.43% | 815 | 71.43% | 13 | 1.14% |
| 2008 | 305 | 26.27% | 841 | 72.44% | 15 | 1.29% |
| 2004 | 395 | 33.11% | 789 | 66.14% | 9 | 0.75% |

In the 2012 presidential election, Democrat Barack Obama received 71.4% of the vote (815 cast), ahead of Republican Mitt Romney with 27.4% (313 votes), and other candidates with 1.1% (13 votes), among the 1,256 ballots cast by the borough's 1,530 registered voters (115 ballots were spoiled), for a turnout of 82.1%. In the 2008 presidential election, Democrat Barack Obama received 71.7% of the vote (841 cast), ahead of Republican John McCain with 26.0% (305 votes) and other candidates with 1.3% (15 votes), among the 1,173 ballots cast by the borough's 1,493 registered voters, for a turnout of 78.6%. In the 2004 presidential election, Democrat John Kerry received 65.0% of the vote (789 ballots cast), outpolling Republican George W. Bush with 32.6% (395 votes) and other candidates with 0.6% (9 votes), among the 1,213 ballots cast by the borough's 1,437 registered voters, for a turnout percentage of 84.4.

Gubernatorial election results for Hopewell
| Year | Republican | | Democratic | | Third party(ies) | |
| Year | No. | % | No. | % | No. | % |
|---|---|---|---|---|---|---|
| 2025 | 210 | 18.17% | 938 | 81.14% | 8 | 0.69% |
| 2021 | 207 | 21.70% | 735 | 77.04% | 12 | 1.26% |
| 2017 | 188 | 23.30% | 609 | 75.46% | 10 | 1.24% |
| 2013 | 344 | 44.05% | 416 | 53.27% | 21 | 2.69% |
| 2009 | 291 | 32.44% | 511 | 56.97% | 95 | 10.59% |
| 2005 | 265 | 31.85% | 542 | 65.14% | 25 | 3.00% |

In the 2013 gubernatorial election, Democrat Barbara Buono received 53.3% of the vote (416 cast), ahead of Republican Chris Christie with 44.0% (344 votes), and other candidates with 2.7% (21 votes), among the 792 ballots cast by the borough's 1,518 registered voters (11 ballots were spoiled), for a turnout of 52.2%. In the 2009 gubernatorial election, Democrat Jon Corzine received 56.7% of the vote (511 ballots cast), ahead of Republican Chris Christie with 32.3% (291 votes), Independent Chris Daggett with 10.0% (90 votes) and other candidates with 0.6% (5 votes), among the 902 ballots cast by the borough's 1,466 registered voters, yielding a 61.5% turnout.

United States Senate election results for Hopewell1
| Year | Republican | | Democratic | | Third party(ies) | |
| Year | No. | % | No. | % | No. | % |
|---|---|---|---|---|---|---|
| 2024 | 234 | 19.09% | 977 | 79.69% | 15 | 1.22% |
| 2018 | 262 | 27.75% | 646 | 68.43% | 36 | 3.81% |
| 2012 | 285 | 26.36% | 773 | 71.51% | 23 | 2.13% |
| 2006 | 249 | 29.61% | 575 | 68.37% | 17 | 2.02% |

United States Senate election results for Hopewell2
| Year | Republican | | Democratic | | Third party(ies) | |
| Year | No. | % | No. | % | No. | % |
|---|---|---|---|---|---|---|
| 2020 | 280 | 21.46% | 1,001 | 76.70% | 24 | 1.84% |
| 2014 | 185 | 25.48% | 527 | 72.59% | 14 | 1.93% |
| 2013 | 134 | 23.47% | 431 | 75.48% | 6 | 1.05% |
| 2008 | 358 | 32.60% | 716 | 65.21% | 24 | 2.19% |

== Education ==
Public school students in pre-kindergarten through twelfth grade attend the Hopewell Valley Regional School District. The comprehensive regional public school district serves students from Hopewell Borough, Hopewell Township and Pennington Borough. As of the 2019–20 school year, the district, comprised of six schools, had an enrollment of 3,467 students and 351.1 classroom teachers (on an FTE basis), for a student–teacher ratio of 9.9:1. Schools in the district (with 2019–20 enrollment data from the National Center for Education Statistics) are Bear Tavern Elementary School with 397 students in grades Pre-K–5, Hopewell Elementary School with 400 students in grades Pre-K–5, Stony Brook Elementary School with 378 students in grades K–5, Toll Gate Grammar School with 306 students in grades K–5, Timberlane Middle School with 820 students in grades 6–8 and Hopewell Valley Central High School with 1,097 students in grades 9–12. Elementary school students from Hopewell Borough attend Hopewell Elementary School. The district's board of education is comprised of nine members allocated to each of the three municipalities based on population, with Hopewell assigned a single seat.

Eighth grade students from all of Mercer County are eligible to apply to attend the high school programs offered by the Mercer County Technical Schools, a county-wide vocational school district that offers full-time career and technical education at its Health Sciences Academy, STEM Academy and Academy of Culinary Arts, with no tuition charged to students for attendance.

== Transportation ==
=== Roads and highways ===
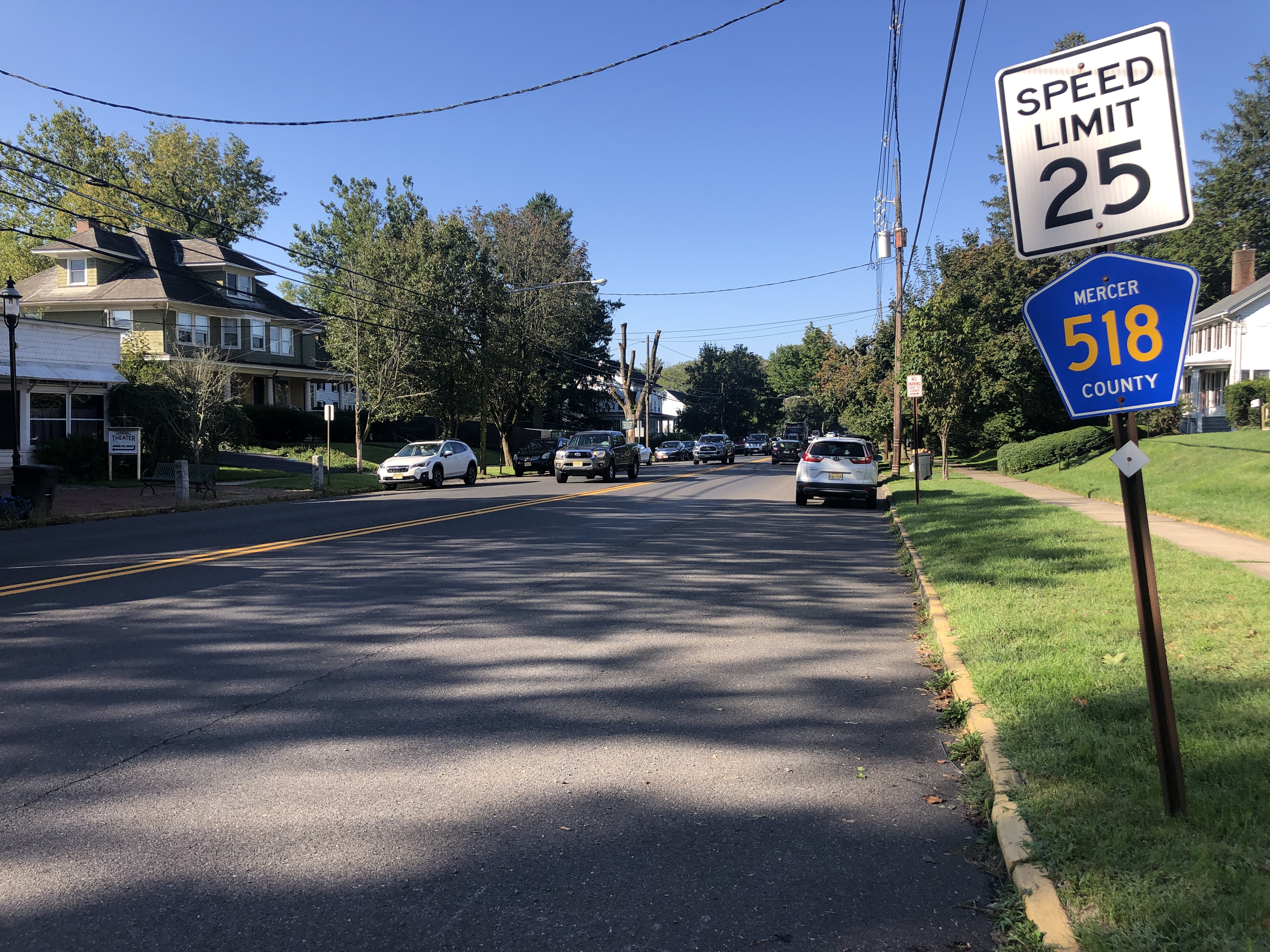
County Route 518 is the primary roadway through Hopewell

As of May 2010, the borough had a total of 9.35 miles (15.05 km) of roadways, of which 7.56 miles (12.17 km) were maintained by the municipality and 1.79 miles (2.88 km) by Mercer County.

Hopewell has four major roads that travel through it.

- County Route 518 enters Hopewell from due west having come from Lambertville and then turns slightly northward, joining West Broad Street. Route 518 then runs through Hopewell and exits Hopewell in the East and heads towards Rocky Hill.
- Pennington Hopewell Road (County Route 654) enters Hopewell from roughly the southwest, and immediately becomes West Broad Street when it enters Hopewell. It connects Hopewell with Pennington to the south.
- Princeton Avenue, County Route 569 starts at Broad Street and continues south and becomes Hopewell-Princeton Road, and connects Hopewell with Princeton.
- Greenwood Avenue runs north out of Hopewell and connects Hopewell with East Amwell Township.

Route 31 is accessible via Route 518 and Route 654.

=== Rail ===
NJ Transit is planning to restore passenger commuter rail service to Hopewell on the West Trenton Line. NJ Transit plans to use the existing one-track right of way that CSX owns through Hopewell, the former four-track Reading Company Trenton Line. The proposed plan includes double tracking most of the CSX line to increase capacity and construction of a new rail station on Somerset Street. The use of the historic Hopewell Station is not under consideration in this current proposal. The line would connect Hopewell with New York City, as well as Philadelphia via a SEPTA connection in West Trenton and restore service to Hopewell, which ended in 1982.

== Climate ==
According to the Köppen climate classification system, Hopewell Borough has a Hot-summer Humid continental climate (Dfa).

Climate data for Hopewell Borough (40.3893, -74.7638), 1991-2020 normals, extremes 1981-2024
| Month | Jan | Feb | Mar | Apr | May | Jun | Jul | Aug | Sep | Oct | Nov | Dec | Year |
|---|---|---|---|---|---|---|---|---|---|---|---|---|---|
| Record high °F (°C) | 71.1 (21.7) | 77.7 (25.4) | 87.5 (30.8) | 94.2 (34.6) | 94.9 (34.9) | 96.7 (35.9) | 102.1 (38.9) | 99.3 (37.4) | 96.8 (36.0) | 92.6 (33.7) | 80.5 (26.9) | 75.1 (23.9) | 102.1 (38.9) |
| Mean daily maximum °F (°C) | 39.2 (4.0) | 41.7 (5.4) | 49.8 (9.9) | 62.2 (16.8) | 71.9 (22.2) | 80.9 (27.2) | 85.6 (29.8) | 83.8 (28.8) | 77.3 (25.2) | 65.3 (18.5) | 54.4 (12.4) | 44.1 (6.7) | 63.1 (17.3) |
| Daily mean °F (°C) | 30.6 (−0.8) | 32.5 (0.3) | 40.1 (4.5) | 51.3 (10.7) | 61.0 (16.1) | 70.1 (21.2) | 75.0 (23.9) | 73.3 (22.9) | 66.4 (19.1) | 54.6 (12.6) | 44.3 (6.8) | 35.6 (2.0) | 53.0 (11.7) |
| Mean daily minimum °F (°C) | 22.0 (−5.6) | 23.3 (−4.8) | 30.3 (−0.9) | 40.3 (4.6) | 50.1 (10.1) | 59.3 (15.2) | 64.5 (18.1) | 62.7 (17.1) | 55.5 (13.1) | 43.9 (6.6) | 34.2 (1.2) | 27.2 (−2.7) | 42.9 (6.1) |
| Record low °F (°C) | −12.8 (−24.9) | −3.3 (−19.6) | 1.6 (−16.9) | 17.4 (−8.1) | 30.8 (−0.7) | 39.9 (4.4) | 47.0 (8.3) | 40.5 (4.7) | 34.9 (1.6) | 23.9 (−4.5) | 8.4 (−13.1) | −0.8 (−18.2) | −12.8 (−24.9) |
| Average precipitation inches (mm) | 3.66 (93) | 2.86 (73) | 4.21 (107) | 3.91 (99) | 4.16 (106) | 4.59 (117) | 5.18 (132) | 4.53 (115) | 4.32 (110) | 4.25 (108) | 3.41 (87) | 4.45 (113) | 49.53 (1,258) |
| Average snowfall inches (cm) | 8.7 (22) | 9.3 (24) | 4.1 (10) | 0.2 (0.51) | 0.0 (0.0) | 0.0 (0.0) | 0.0 (0.0) | 0.0 (0.0) | 0.0 (0.0) | 0.3 (0.76) | 0.7 (1.8) | 3.7 (9.4) | 26.9 (68) |
| Average dew point °F (°C) | 20.8 (−6.2) | 21.1 (−6.1) | 26.8 (−2.9) | 36.4 (2.4) | 48.5 (9.2) | 58.9 (14.9) | 63.6 (17.6) | 63.0 (17.2) | 56.8 (13.8) | 45.3 (7.4) | 34.0 (1.1) | 26.4 (−3.1) | 41.9 (5.5) |
Source 1: PRISM
Source 2: NOHRSC (Snow, 2008/2009 - 2024/2025 normals)

== Ecology ==
According to the A. W. Kuchler U.S. potential natural vegetation types, Hopewell Borough would have a dominant vegetation type of Appalachian Oak (104) with a dominant vegetation form of Eastern Hardwood Forest (25).

== In popular culture ==
The borough's post office appears in the 2025 film Marty Supreme.

== Notable people ==
People who were born in, residents of, or otherwise closely associated with Hopewell include:

- Danielia Cotton (born 1967), singer-songwriter
- John Hart (c. 1711–1779), signer of the United States Declaration of Independence, whose grave is located in the First Baptist Church graveyard on Broad Street
- Amy Locane (born 1971), television and film actress who appeared in John Waters' 1990 musical comedy Cry-Baby and in the first season of the prime time soap opera Melrose Place
- Josiah Lincoln Lowe (1905–1997), mycologist who served as president of the Mycological Society of America
- Leo Halpin Mahony (born 1931), architect of Mahony & Zvosec
- James W. Marshall (1810–1885), sawmill operator, whose 1848 find of gold in the American River in California was the impetus for the California Gold Rush
- Richard Preston (born 1954), author of The Hot Zone
- Keith Robertson (1914–1991), author of children's literature
- Jonathan Williams (born 1984/85), politician who has represented the Washington-3 district in the Vermont House of Representatives since 2023
