= Old School Baptist Church and Cemetery of Hopewell =

- U.S. National Register of Historic Places
- U.S. Historic district
- New Jersey Register of Historic Places
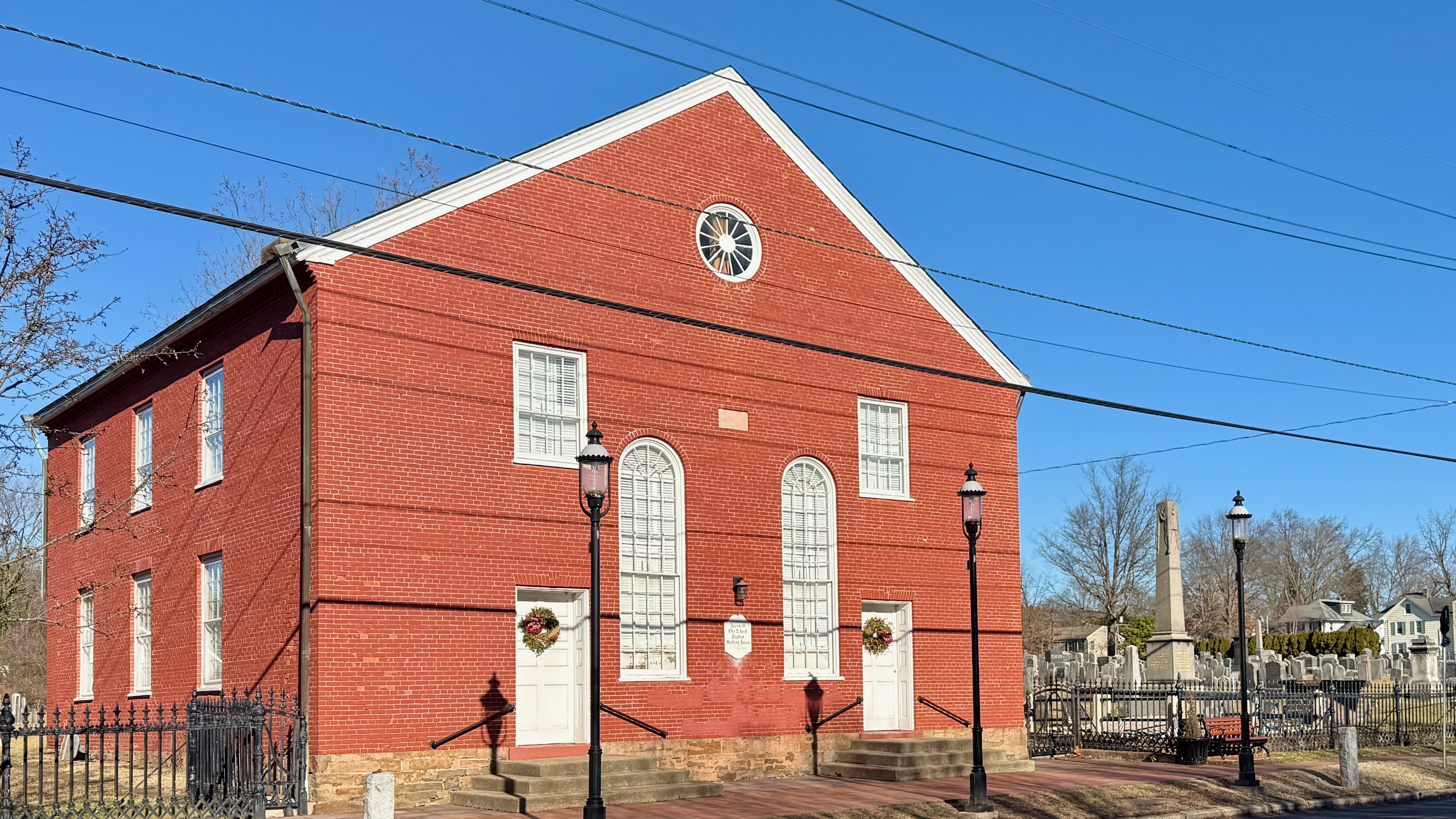
- Hopewell Old School Baptist Meeting House and Cemetery in 2024

- Location within Mercer County, New Jersey Location within New Jersey Location within the United States
- Location: 46 West Broad Street, Hopewell, New Jersey
- Coordinates: 40°23′18″N 74°45′53″W
- Area: 4 acres (1.6 ha)
- Architectural style: Federal
- NRHP reference No.: 100011029
- NJRHP No.: 5931

Significant dates
- Added to NRHP: November 25, 2024
- Designated NJRHP: October 8, 2024

The Old School Baptist Church, historically known as the First Baptist Church of Hopewell, is located at 46 West Broad Street in the borough of Hopewell in Mercer County, New Jersey, United States. The red brick church was built in 1822. The adjoining Old School Baptist Cemetery was established in 1747. The church and cemetery were listed as part of the Old School Baptist Church and Cemetery of Hopewell historic district in the National Register of Historic Places in 2024.

== History ==
The Baptist congregation in Hopewell was organized in 1715, led by Johnathan Stout. In 1747, John Hart donated land for the church and cemetery. The first church building was erected from 1747 to 1748. Its first minister was Reverend Isaac Eaton, who served until his death in 1772. In 1822, the current Federal architecture red brick church was built on the site of the first church. In 1936, it was documented by the Historic American Buildings Survey (HABS). In 1974, there were no surviving members of the congregation and the property changed from a religious organization to a private foundation and museum. In February 2023, Hopewell Old School Baptist Meetinghouse, Inc., was registered as a New Jersey public charity to preserve the property.

The Old School Baptist Church and Cemetery of Hopewell historic district was added to the National Register of Historic Places on November 25, 2024, for its significance in art and architecture. The 4-acre (1.6 ha) district includes one contributing building, one contributing site, one contributing structure, and three contributing objects.

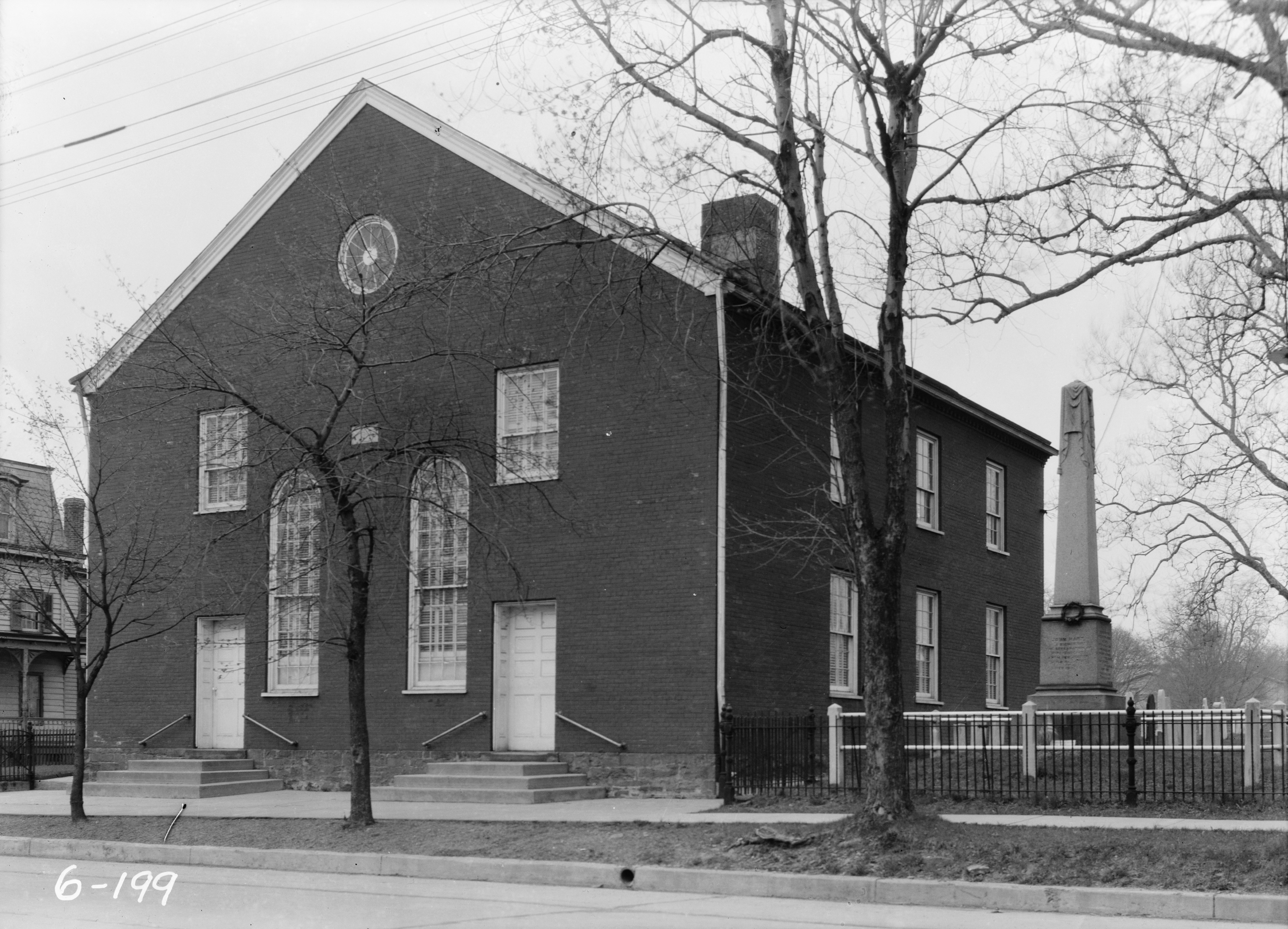
HABS photo from 1936

== Cemetery ==
The cemetery was started in 1747. A marble tombstone is affixed to the exterior church wall for the Reverend Isaac Eaton, who had been buried inside the original church building. He is presumed buried under the current church building. In 1873, a cast and wrought iron fence, made by Joseph B. Yard of Trenton, was erected around the cemetery. It is a contributing structure of the district. The cemetery has three contributing objects. The ornate gravestones for John Hobbs (d. 1761) and Elizabeth Hobbs (d. 1767) were carved and labeled by professional tombstone maker Jonathan Hand Osborn of Scotch Plains. The gravestone for Catherine Stout (d. 1749), the oldest legible one in the cemetery, was carved by Ebenezer Price. John Hart may have been originally buried in a family plot. His remains were moved here in 1864 and a granite draped obelisk erected as a memorial monument.

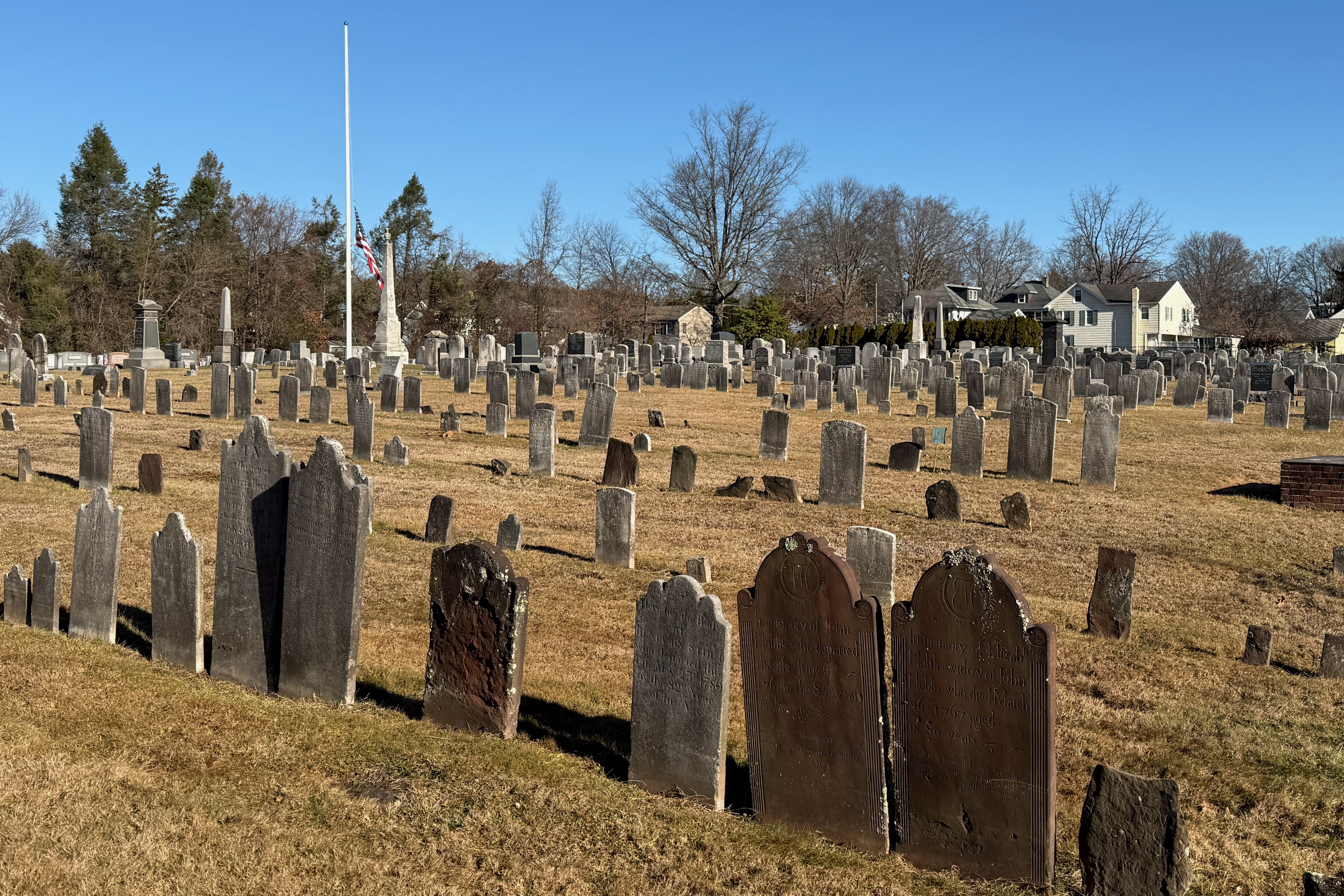
Area view of the cemetery

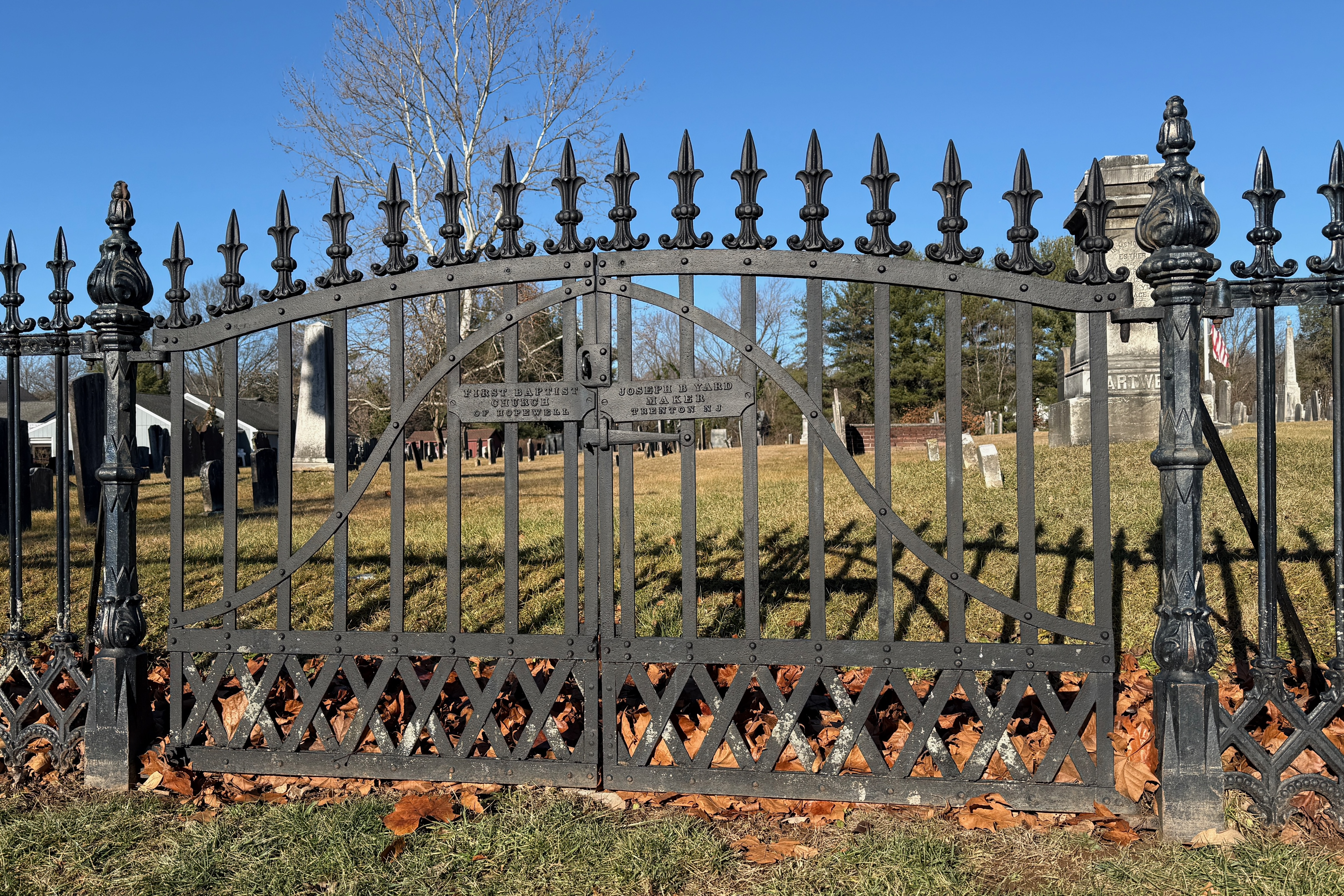
Entrance gate in the iron fence

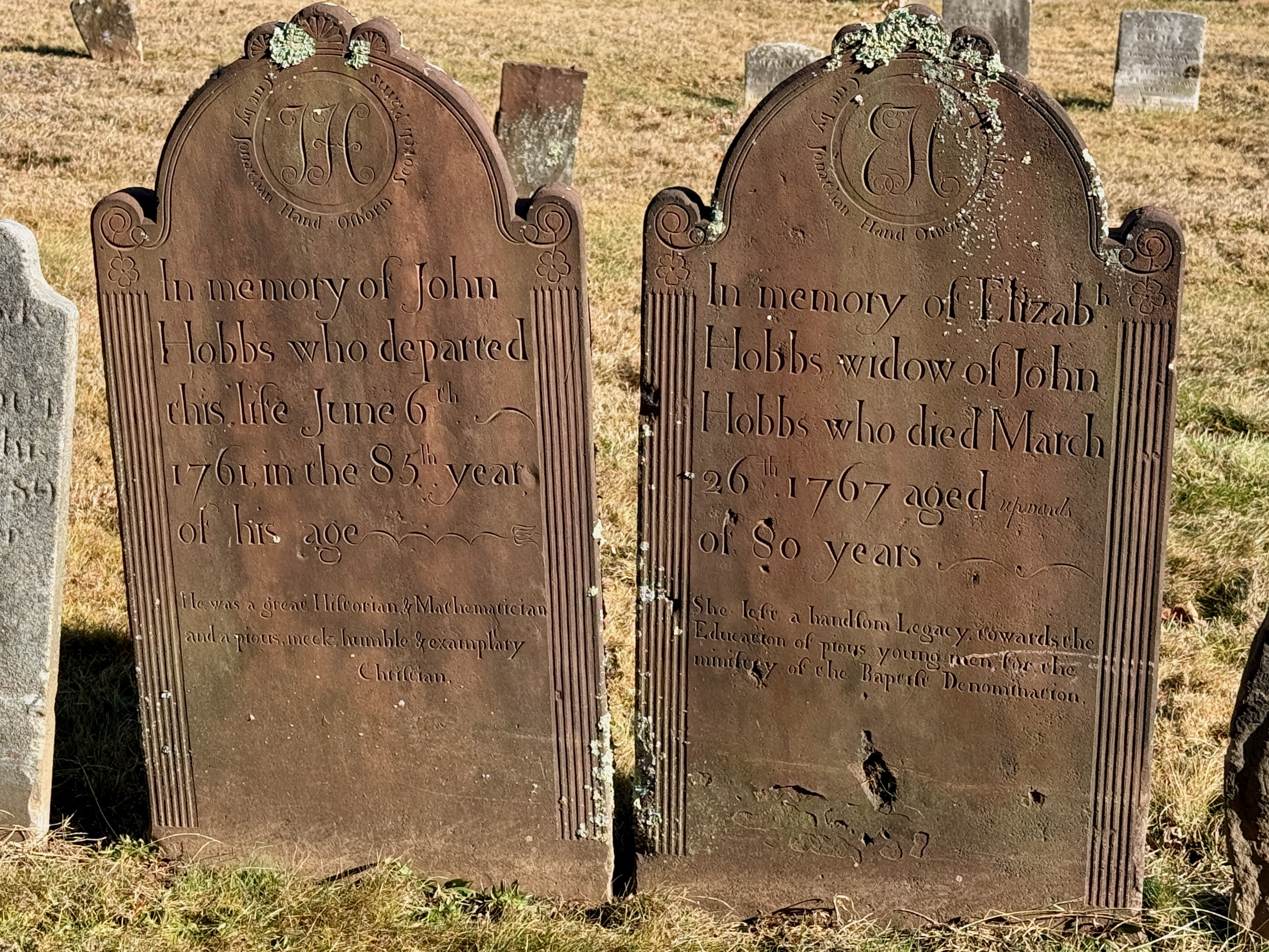
John Hobbs and Elizabeth Hobbs gravestones

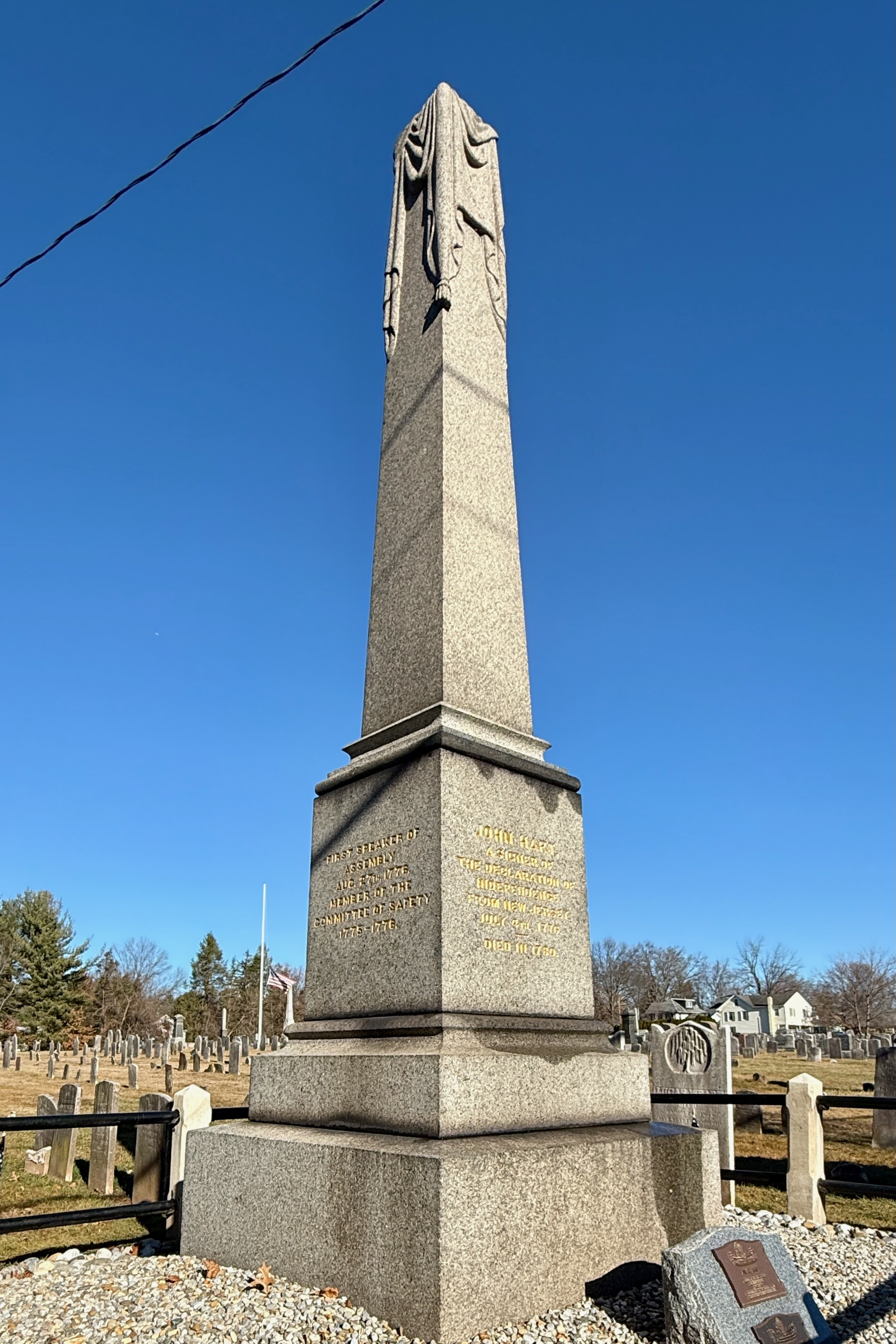
John Hart monument

=== Notable burials ===
- Isaac Eaton (1724–1772) – first minister of the church, founder of the Hopewell Academy
- John Hart (d. 1779) – donated land for the church, signatory of the Declaration of Independence

== See also ==
- National Register of Historic Places listings in Mercer County, New Jersey
- List of Baptist churches
