= Leo Halpin Mahony =

American architect (1931–2010)

- Born: November 5, 1931; Baldwin, New York, U.S.
- Died: June 18, 2010 (aged 78); Delran, New Jersey, U.S.
- Occupation: Architect
- Known for: Principal in Leo H. Mahony and partner in Mahony & Zvosec

Leo Halpin Mahony, AIA (November 5, 1931 – June 18, 2010), was an American architect who practiced in the mid to late-twentieth-century Connecticut, New York, New Jersey, and Pennsylvania, under his own name as Leo H. Mahony (fl. 1962–1967) and partner in the architectural firm name of Mahony & Zvosec, Architects & Planners, of Princeton, New Jersey from 1967.

== Personal life ==
Born on November 5, 1931, in Baldwin, New York, Mahony earned his Bachelor of Architecture from the Pratt Institute in 1958. In 1970, he lived on Woodsville Road, Hopewell, New Jersey 08525. Mahony was the president of Jaycees, South Brunswick Township from 1962 to 1963. Chairman of the Zoning Board Adjustment, South Brunswick Township from 1964 to 1965. He served in the United States Air Force as a Staff Sergeant from 1949 to 1952. Mahony died on June 18, 2010, at the age of 78.

== Architectural career ==
Mahony joined the New Jersey Society of Architects, American Institute of Architects, in 1963, and was registered to practice in Connecticut, New York, New Jersey, and Pennsylvania. He practiced under his own name, Leo H. Mahony, from 1962 to 1967. With John M. Zvosec, he established Mahony & Zvosec in 1967. The firm practiced out of the Gallup Robinson Building, Research Park, Princeton, New Jersey 08540.

== Works as Leo H. Mahony ==
- 1965: Our Lady of Mercy Church (South Bound Brook, New Jersey)
- 1966: Our Lady Of Calvary Retreat House (Farmington, Connecticut)

== Works as Mahony & Zvosec ==
- 1969: South Brunswick Township Public Library (South Brunswick, New Jersey)
- 1969: St. Anthony's Church & School (Highstown, New Jersey)
- 1969: St. Luke's Church & Rectory (North Plainfield, New Jersey)
