= John Hart (New Jersey politician) =

American Founding Father and politician

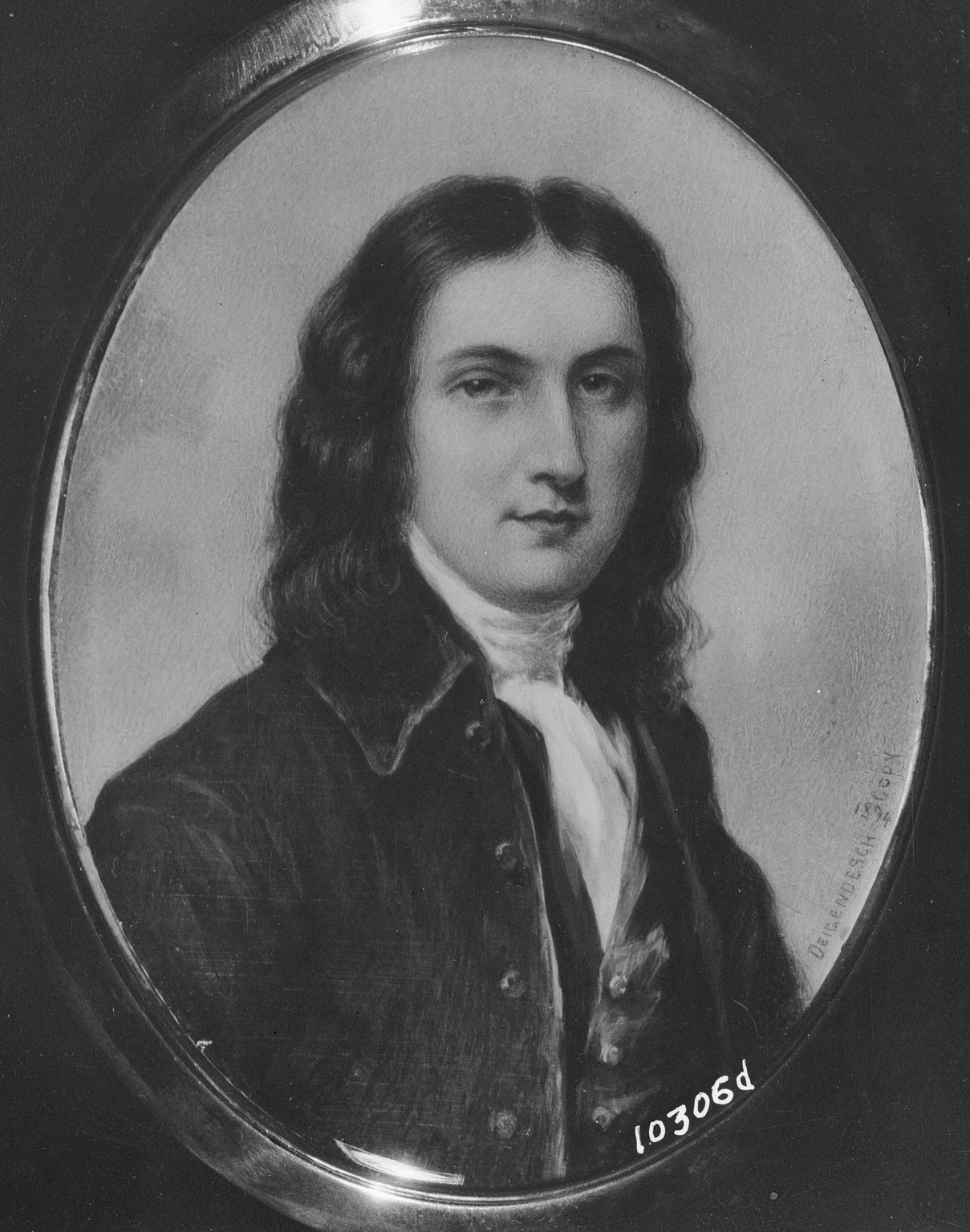
- Born: c. 1713; Hopewell Twp., NJ, https://bioguide.congress.gov/search/bio/H000288
- Died: May 11, 1779; Hunterdon County, New Jersey, U.S.
- Resting place: Old School Baptist Meeting House Burial Ground, Hopewell, New Jersey
- Occupation: Public official/politician
- Known for: Signing the United States Declaration of Independence

John Hart (c. 1713 – May 11, 1779) was an American Founding Father and politician in colonial New Jersey. As a delegate to the Continental Congress, Hart signed the Declaration of Independence. He died several years before the end of the Revolutionary War while still active in patriotic efforts.

== Ancestry ==
Sources disagree as to the year and place of Hart's birth. His official U.S. Congress biography cites 1713 as a likely birth year and Stonington, Connecticut as his birthplace, though his family relocated to Hopewell Township, New Jersey at some point thereafter. Hart was baptized at the Maidenhead Meetinghouse (now the Presbyterian Church of Lawrenceville) on December 31, 1713. He was the son of Captain Edward Hart, a farmer, public assessor, justice of the peace, and leader of a local militia unit during the French and Indian War. Hart was the grandson of John Hart, a carpenter who came to Hopewell from Newtown, Long Island.

== Early life ==
In 1741, Hart married Deborah Scudder (1721–1776). The couple had twelve children: Sarah, Jesse, Martha, Nathaniel, John, Susanna, Mary, Abigail, Edward, Scudder, an infant daughter, Daniel, and Deborah. His wife died on October 28, 1776. In 1747, he donated a piece of land in his front meadow to local Baptists who had been seeking a place to build a church. The location was known for some time thereafter as the Hopewell Old School Baptist Meeting House.

== Political career ==
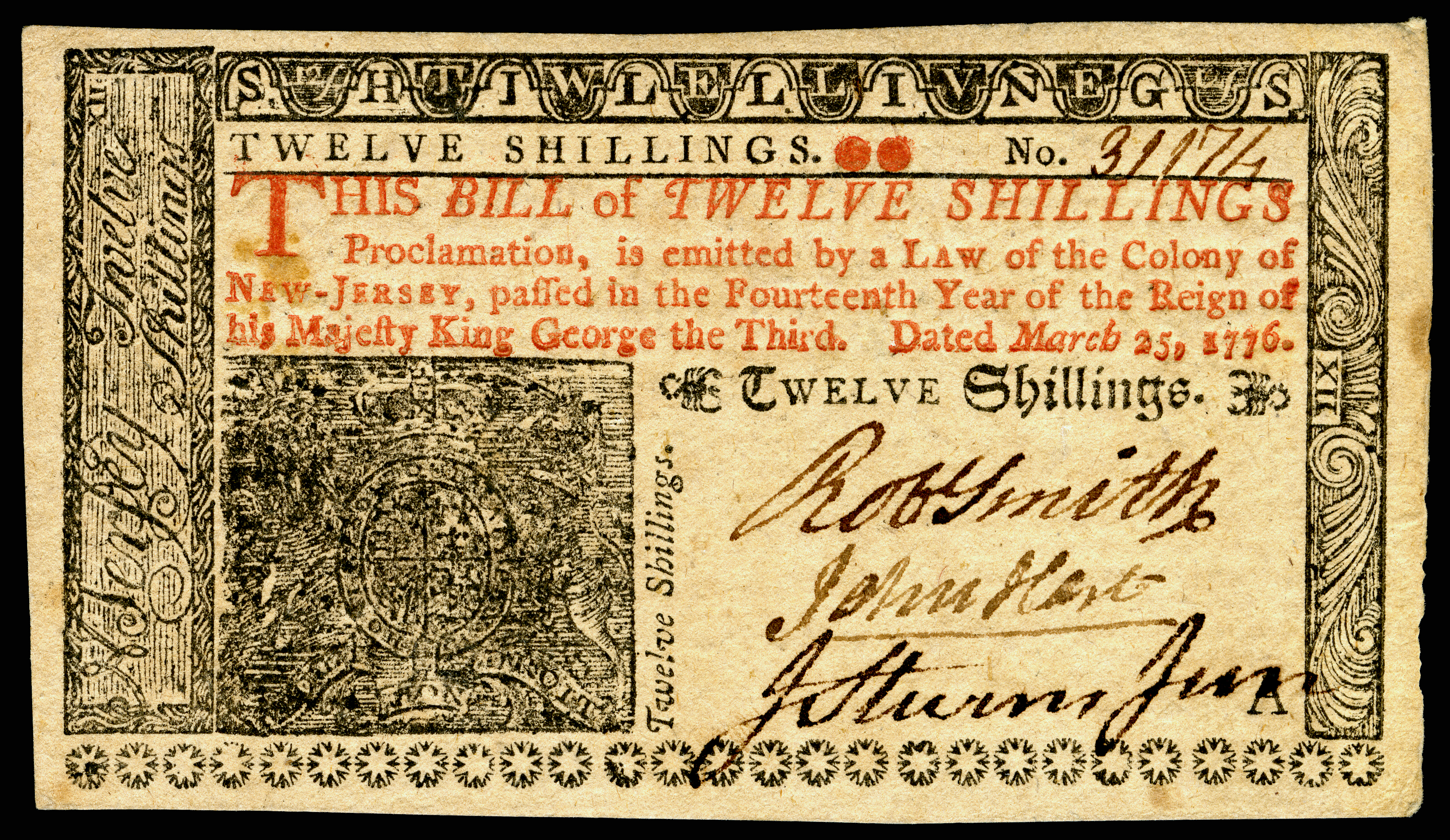
New Jersey Colonial currency (1776) signed by John Hart.

Hart was elected to the Hunterdon County Board of Chosen Freeholders in 1750. He was first elected to the New Jersey Colonial Assembly in 1761 and served there until 1771. He was appointed to the local Committee of safety and the Committee of correspondence, and became a judge on the Court of Common Pleas. He was often called "Honest John."

When New Jersey formed a revolutionary assembly (or provincial congress) in 1776, he was elected to it and served as its vice president. Prior to June 1776, the New Jersey delegation in the First Continental Congress was opposed to independence. As a result, the entire delegation was replaced, and Hart was one of those selected for the Second Continental Congress. He joined in time to vote for and sign the Declaration of Independence. He served until August of that year, then was elected speaker of the newly formed New Jersey General Assembly. He later took on additional duties as Treasurer of the Council of Safety (which was given "extraordinary and summary powers" to carry out affairs of the state during emergencies), President of the joint meetings of the New Jersey Congress, and Commissioner of the State Loan Office.

== Revolutionary War ==
In December 1776, the British advance into New Jersey reached Hunterdon County. A marked man because of his status as speaker of the Assembly, Hart was obliged to escape and hide for a short time in the nearby Sourland Mountains. His farm was raided by British and Hessian troops, who damaged but did not destroy the property. The Continentals' capture of Trenton on December 26 allowed Hart to return home. Prior to the Battle of Monmouth, Hart invited General George Washington and the Continental Army to make camp on his farm, and his offer was accepted. From June 22 to 24, 1778, 12,000 men occupied his fields, and on at least one occasion Washington dined with Hart.

== Death and legacy ==
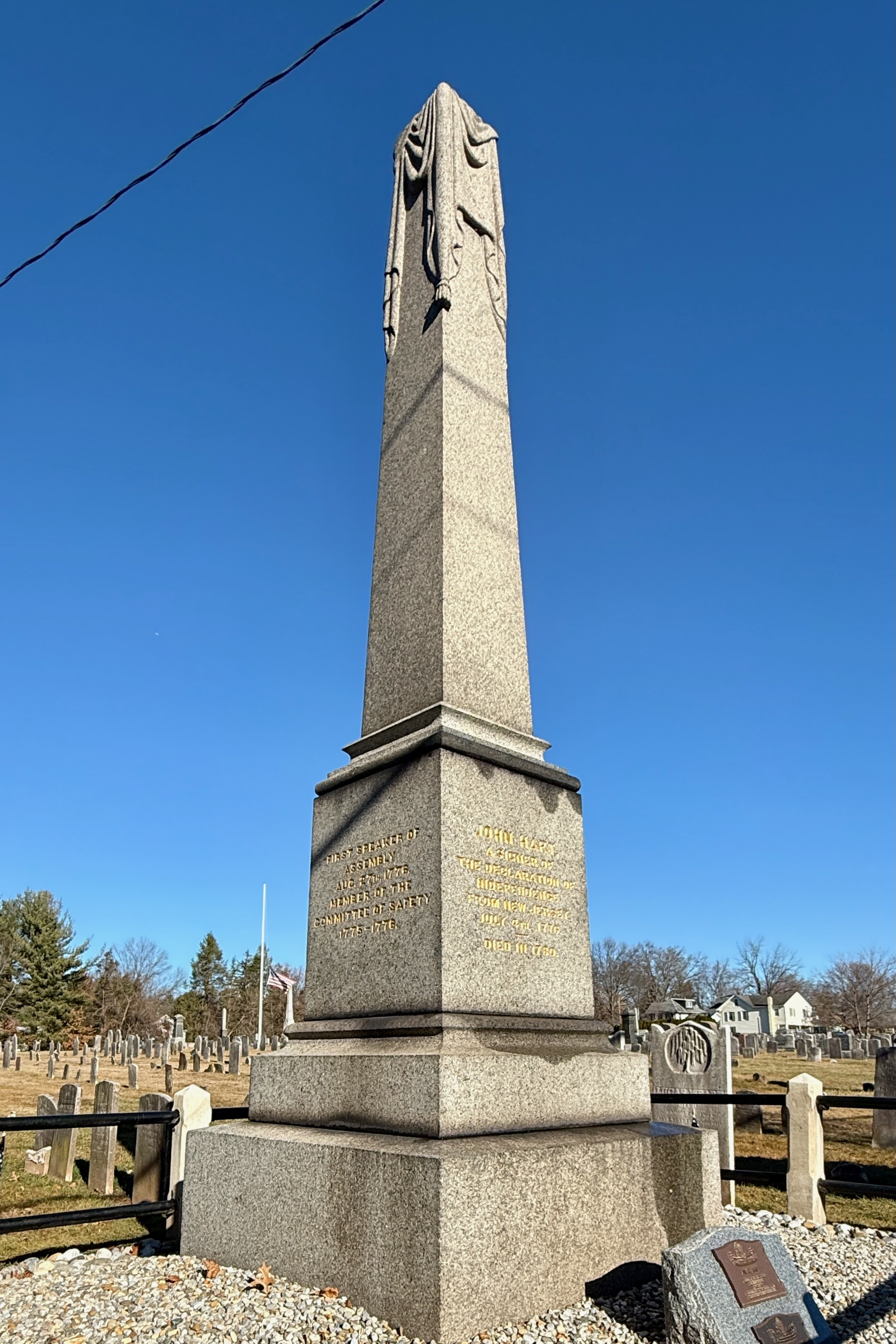
John Hart monument at the Old School Baptist Meeting House in Hopewell, New Jersey

On November 7, 1778, Hart returned to Hopewell from the Assembly in Trenton. Two days later, he indicated that he was too ill with "gravel" (kidney stones) to return. He continued to suffer from the painful affliction for more than six months until his death on May 11, 1779, at age 65. He is buried at the Old School Baptist Meeting House, to which he had donated land.

The following obituary for John Hart appeared on May 19, 1779:

On Tuesday the 11th instant, departed this life at his seat in Hopewell, JOHN HART, Esq. the Representative in General Assembly for the county of Hunterdon, and late Speaker of that House. He had served in the Assembly for many years under the former government, taken an early and active part in the present revolution, and continued to the day he was seized with his last illness to discharge the duties of a faithful and upright patriot in the service of his country in general and the county he represented in particular. The universal approbation of his character and conduct among all ranks of people, is the best testimony of his worth, and as it must make his death regretted and lamented, will ensure lasting respect to his memory.

— New Jersey Gazette

Hart's home stands in present-day Hopewell, New Jersey.

Hart is the ancestor of Congressman John Hart Brewer and former House majority leader Steny Hoyer. Roadways named after Hart include Hart Boulevard in Flemington, New Jersey; Hart Avenue in Hopewell, New Jersey; and Hart Lane in Ringoes, New Jersey.

== See also ==
- Signing of the United States Declaration of Independence
- Memorial to the 56 Signers of the Declaration of Independence
