= Danielia Cotton =

American singer-songwriter (born 1967)

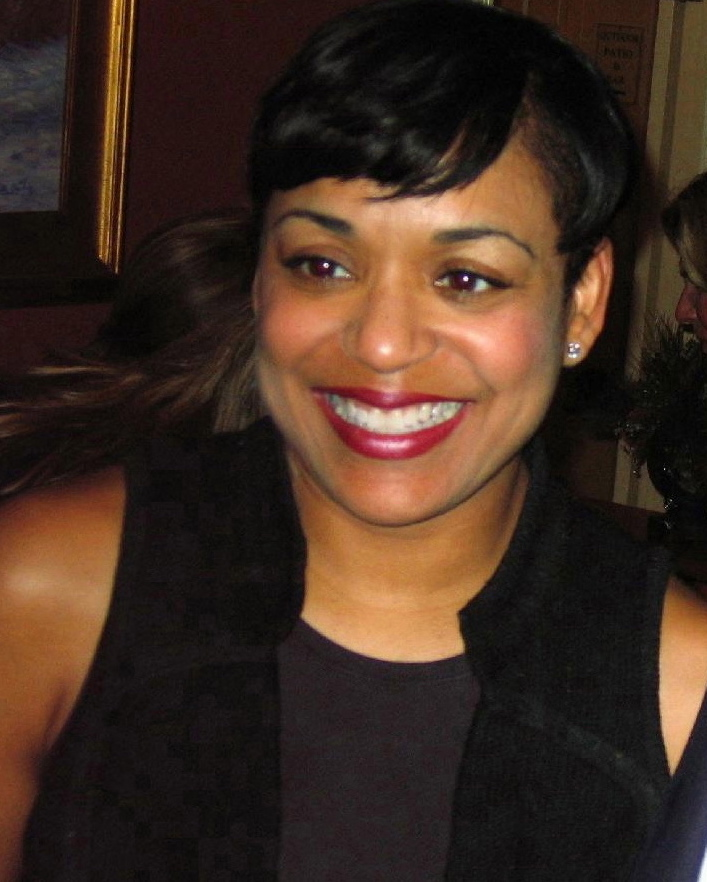
- Cotton in 2010

Background information
- Born: Danielia Brooks; September 24, 1967 (age 58)
- Origin: Hopewell, New Jersey
- Genres: Rock, blues
- Occupation: Singer-songwriter
- Instruments: Vocals, guitar piano
- Years active: 2001–present
- Website: Danielia Cotton's official website

Danielia Cotton (born Danielia Brooks on September 24, 1967) is an American rock singer, songwriter and guitarist.

== Early life and education ==
Cotton grew up in the small western New Jersey town of Hopewell, New Jersey, population 2,010. She was one of four siblings raised by a single mother. Her mother, a jazz singer by avocation, supported the family doing accounting work. When Danielia was 12 years old, her mother gave her an acoustic guitar, she also started singing with her mom and her aunts in a gospel group, the Brooks Ensemble Plus. Growing up as one of only seven black kids in Hopewell Valley Central High School, she was not exposed to R&B and hip-hop. Along with her growing love for rock, Danielia developed a warm appreciation for jazz and gospel. Danielia wound up at the top of her high school class, the first to graduate from the New Jersey School of Performing Arts. Her vocal skills earned her a full scholarship to Bennington College. Danielia chose to pursue acting at Bennington and spent most of her senior year at the Royal Academy of Dramatic Arts in London. She doubled up on credits, so she could still study music, taking tutorials with avant garde jazz trumpeter-professor Bill Dixon, who, she says, "really trained my ear."

== Career ==
In 2005 Cotton released her debut album Small White Town (title inspired by Hopewell). Her second studio album, Rare Child, released May 20, 2008, was ranked in the top ten albums downloaded on iTunes during its first week of release. On July 7, 2009, she released the live EP Live Child, a companion piece to Rare Child. The EP won the 9th Annual Independent Music Award for the ‘Best Live Album’ and 'Live Performance Album Vox Pop' for the album "Righteous People". In 2012, Danielia released The Gun in Your Hand, followed by The Real Book in 2014. In 2017 she released The Mystery of Me, an album that features a mix of rock and soul, from the soaring "Set Me Free" to the deeply personal "Drink" and the upbeat "4 Ur Life," which pulls inspiration from classic Motown as well as Sly and the Family Stone. The album was covered by numerous media outlets including The New York Times.

== Band members ==
- Danielia Cotton – Lead vocals, electric and acoustic rhythm guitars, songwriter
- Marc Copely – Lead guitar, backing vocals
- Winston Roye – Bass
- John Clancy – drums

== Discography ==
=== Studio albums ===
- Small White Town (2005 )
- Rare Child (2008)
- The Gun in Your Hand (2012)
- The Real Book (2014)
- The Mystery of Me (2017)
- Good Day (2022)

=== Extended plays ===
- Danielia Cotton (2004)
- Live Child (2009)
- Woodstock (2014)
- A Prayer (2016)
- A Different War (Danielia Cotton & The Church Boys) (2020)

=== Singles ===
- "Testify" (2008)
- "Forgive Me" (2017)
