= Hopewell Museum =

Museum in Hopewell, New Jersey

Coordinates: 40.39052°N 74.76032°W

The Hopewell Museum is an American history museum in Hopewell, New Jersey.

== History ==
The museum was incorporated in 1922 as the Hopewell Free Public Library and Museum Funding and Building Association. It was formed to raise funds for a building to house a collection of antiques donated by Sarah D. Stout. This collection became the cornerstone of the museum. Many of the items having been used by the early inhabitants of Hopewell.

The original Museum and Hopewell Public Library were housed in a three-storey brownstone that was built by Randolph Stout in 1877. In 1965 the Hopewell Public Library moved to its present location and in 1967 a two-story addition was made to the Museum building. The additional space enabled the Hopewell Museum to display other collections of Southwestern Native American crafts donated by Dr. David H. Hill.

Apart from Native American antiquities, the museum displays relics of American village life from colonial days to the present.

In 1974 Alice Blackwell Lewis was the curator of the museum.
