= James Manning (minister) =

American minister, RI Delegate, Founder of Brown University (1738–1791)

The Reverend James Manning
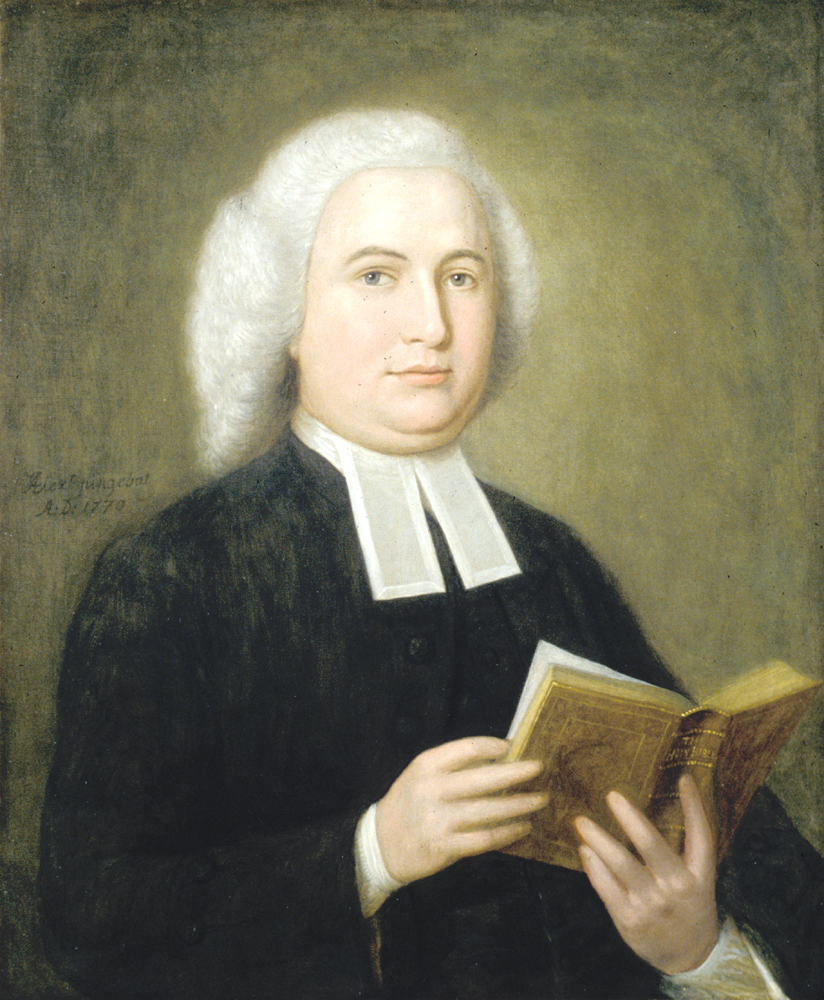

1st President of Brown University
- In office 1765–1791
- Succeeded by: Jonathan Maxcy

Delegate to the Continental Congress for Rhode Island & Providence Plantations
- In office 1786–1786

Personal details
- Born: October 22, 1738 Elizabethtown, Province of New Jersey, British America
- Died: July 29, 1791 (aged 52) Providence, Rhode Island, U.S.
- Resting place: North Burial Ground; Providence, Rhode Island, U.S.
- Spouse: Margaret Stites
- Education: The College of New Jersey
- Profession: University president Minister; Politician

James Manning (October 22, 1738 – July 29, 1791) was an American Baptist minister, educator and legislator from Providence, Rhode Island. He was the first president of Brown University and one of its most involved founders, and served as minister of the First Baptist Church in America.

== Early life and education ==
Manning was born in Elizabethtown, New Jersey. At the age of 18, he attended Hopewell Academy in Hopewell, New Jersey under the direction of the Reverend Isaac Eaton in preparation for his religious studies. In 1762, he graduated from the College of New Jersey, which would later become Princeton University. At Princeton, Manning studied under president Samuel Finley who served under a board of trustees that declared, "Our idea is to send into the World good Scholars and useful members of Society." One of the 130 graduates Finley sent out during his five-year presidency was, notably, the Rev. James Manning. He married Margaret Stites in the year of his graduation from Princeton and a few weeks after the marriage he was publicly ordained by Scotch Plains' Baptist Church.

== Brown University presidency ==
In 1764, Manning was sent by the Philadelphia Baptist Association to found a college in Rhode Island, the cradle of American Baptists. Along with prominent Rhode Islanders, Manning was one of the founders of the College in the English Colony of Rhode Island and Providence Plantations (now Brown University) during the British colonial period. Manning served as Brown's first president from 1765 to 1791. He first ran the university at his parsonage and the Baptist meeting house in Warren, Rhode Island. The university moved to Providence in 1770 and during his tenure built its first buildings on college hill, with the help of the Brown family. While serving as Brown's first president, Rev. James Manning "arrived in Rhode Island accompanied by a personal slave".

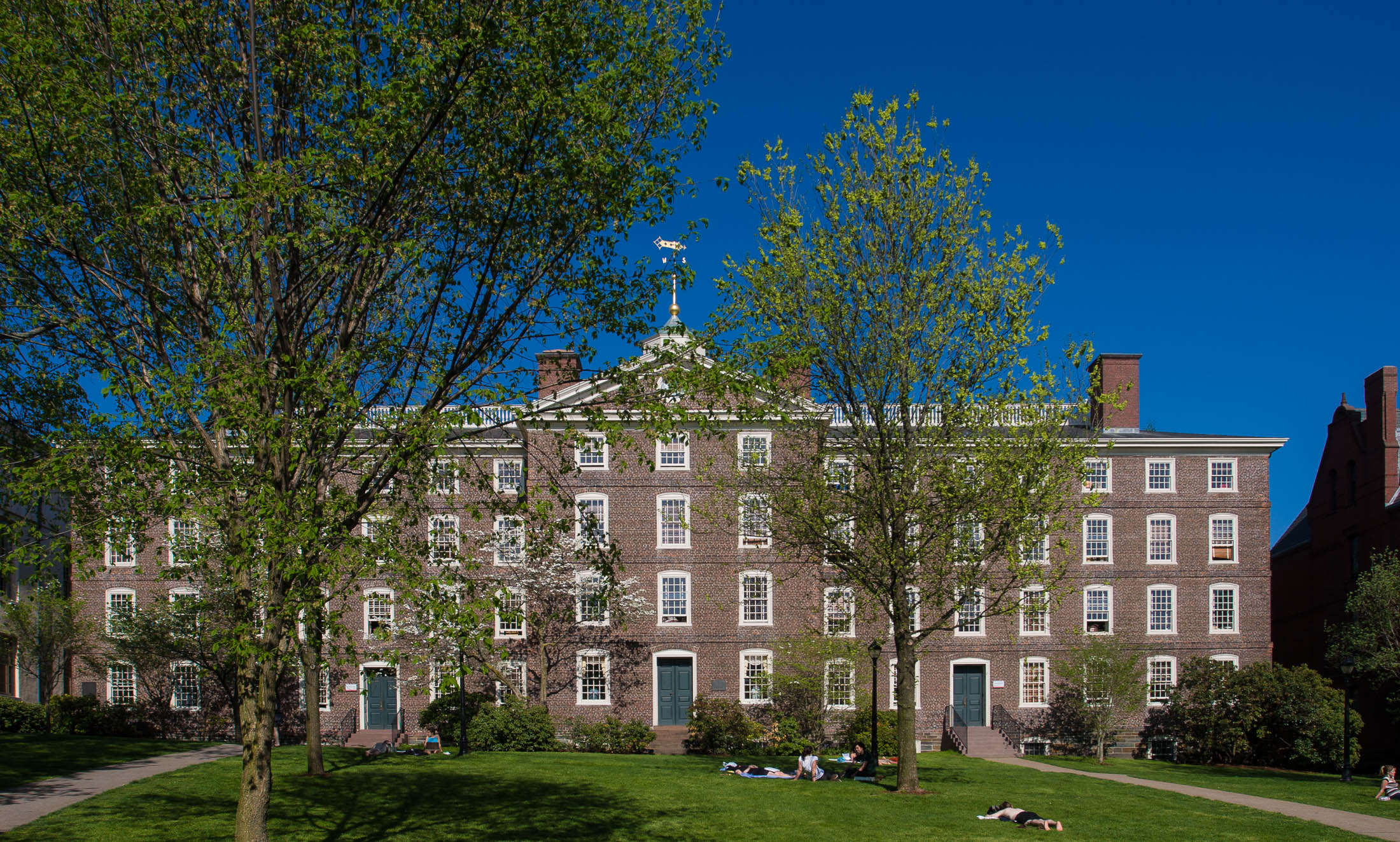
Built in 1770, University Hall is the oldest building on Brown's campus, one of the oldest academic buildings in the United States. Built during his presidency, it was the center of the university during President Manning's tenure.

Reverend Manning gave the library of the college its first book, Valentin Schindler's Lexicon Pentaglotton Hebraicum, Chaldaicum, Syriacum, Talmudico-Rabbinicum & Arabicum, which was printed in Hanover, Germany in 1612.

In February 1786, prominent Virginian Robert Carter III of the Nomony Hall plantation in Virginia, wrote to President Manning regarding his two sons George and John Tasker Carter who were to be enrolled at the college and board with Manning that: "they [are] to be Sent from Boston immediately upon their Arrival there to your College in Providence. I beg leave to appoint you their Foster Father intimating that my desire is that both my Said Sons shd. be active Characters in Life."

Manning presided over Brown's first commencement in 1769, at which time seven students received the degree of Bachelor of Arts and 21 honorary degrees were conferred. During his tenure, 165 men earned degrees from the college including 43 clergymen, 29 lawyers, 19 physicians, 19 teachers, 12 judges, 12 business men, 6 professors, 6 congressmen, 2 college presidents, 2 United States ministers, 1 United States consul, 1 governor, and 1 librarian.

== American revolutionary period ==
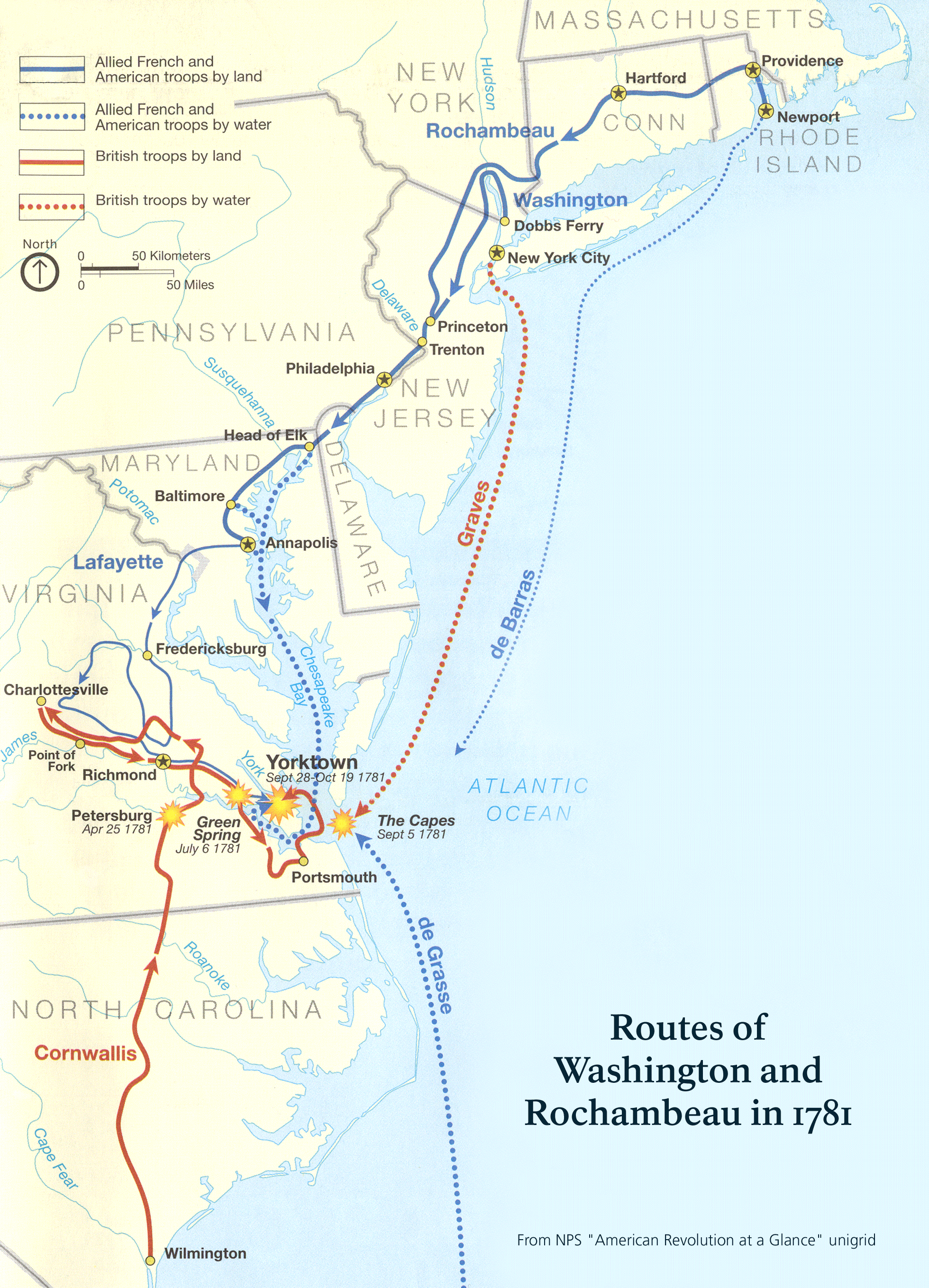
National Park Service map of the W3R Route

In 1774, Dr. Manning presented an argument in favor of religious freedom in an address at Philadelphia's Carpenter's Hall to leading figures from Massachusetts, New Jersey, Pennsylvania and other colonies:

It has been said by a celebrated writer in politics, that but two things are worth contending for--Religion and Liberty. For the latter we are at present nobly exerting ourselves through all this extensive continent; and surely no one whose bosom feels the patriotic glow in behalf of civil liberty can remain torpid to the more ennobling flame of RELIGIOUS FREEDOM.

In the course of the American Revolution, Manning was serving as president of Brown in 1780 when French troops under the command of the Comte de Rochambeau, who led troops sent by King Louis XVI of France, landed in Newport, Rhode Island to aid American troops under the command of General George Washington in the American Revolutionary War. These allied troops were based in Rhode Island for a year before they embarked on a 600-mile (970 km) march in 1781 from Rhode Island to Virginia, where they fought and defeated British forces sent by King George III of the United Kingdom on the Yorktown, Virginia peninsula in the Siege of Yorktown and the Battle of the Chesapeake. During the year of preparation in Rhode Island, the Brown campus was turned into an encampment site for soldiers, and the College Edifice at Brown (later renamed University Hall) was converted into a military hospital.

== Civic leadership for Rhode Island in Congress ==
In 1786, the Rhode Island General Assembly unanimously elected James Manning to serve as its delegate in the 7th Congress of the Confederation, while Manning also continued his presidency of Brown. During his time in Congress, he served on the Grand Committee, which proposed fundamental amendments to the Articles of Confederation. Manning served in Congress along with future President James Monroe and future United States Senator and Governor of South Carolina Charles Pinckney.

In A History of the Baptists, President Manning is reported to have played an inspirational role in persuading the Massachusetts ratifying convention to adopt the United States Constitution:

When the Constitution of the United States was presented to the States for ratification it was doubtful whether it would pass. Massachusetts and Virginia were the pivotal States. Massachusetts was evenly divided and it was only through the labors of Manning, Stillman and Backus that the Constitution was adopted by that State. The majority was nineteen votes. There were 187 yeas and 168 nays on the last day of the session, and "before the final question was taken, Governor Hancock, the president, invited Dr. Manning to close the solemn invocation with prayer. The prayer was one of lofty patriotism and every heart was filled with reverence.

== Baptist ministry ==
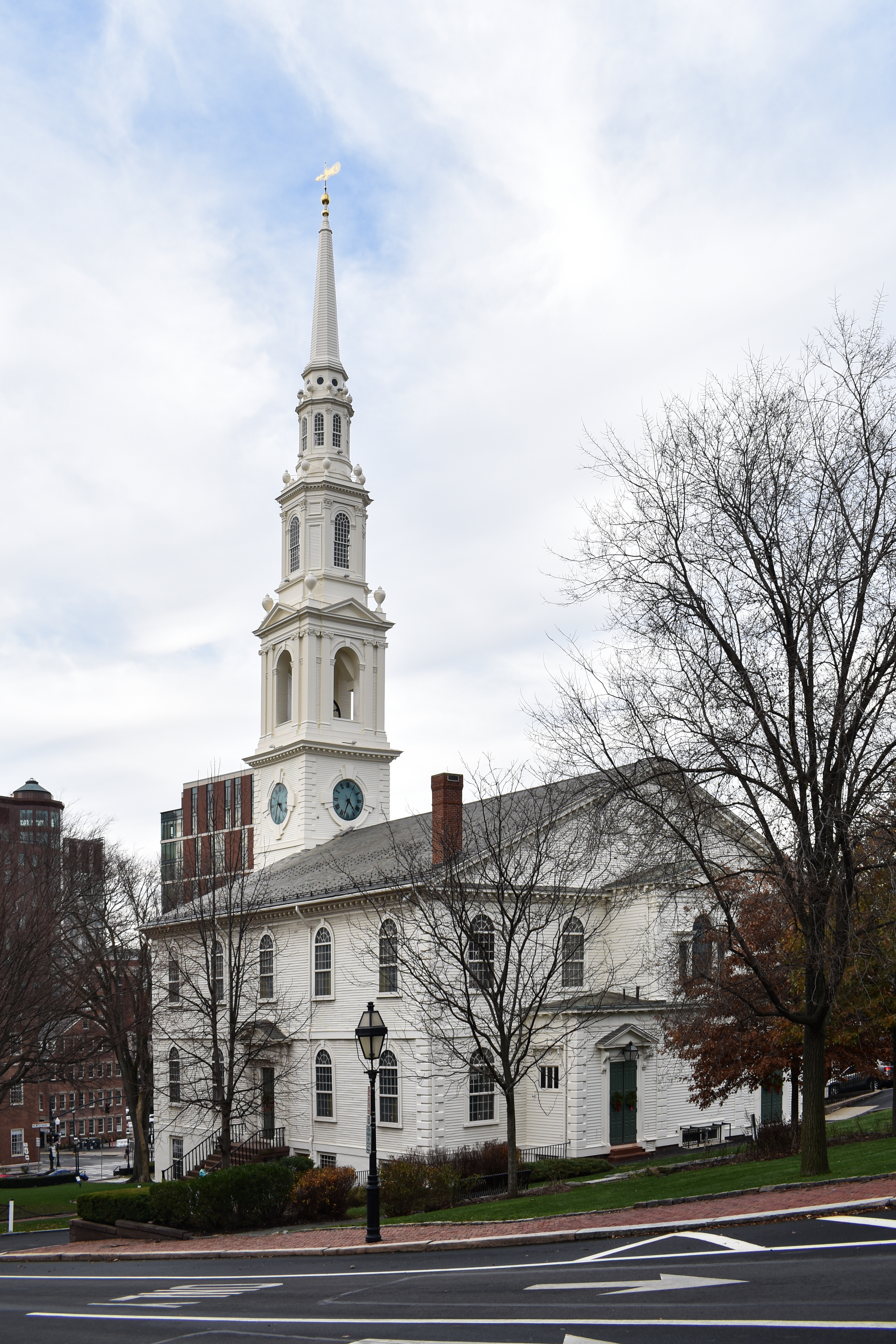
First Baptist Church in America edifice built during Manning's ministry

While serving as president of Brown, Manning was first the minister of the Baptist church in Warren, and then moved to become the minister of the First Baptist Church in America in Providence for the period of July 1771 through April 1791. Like the college, in 1774–1775, Manning led the church in building. Its present building was dedicated to "publick worship" and for "holding commencement in" 1775. Manning's nephew Stephen Gano became pastor in 1792.

== The President James Manning Medal ==
The Brown University Office of the Chaplains and Religious Life annually awards a medal in honor of Manning to a member of the graduating class based upon the award description described in the nomination form:

The President James Manning Medal is awarded to a [graduating senior] whose pursuit of excellence in the study and practice of religion is exemplary. This award is given in honor of Brown's first president, who exemplified the synthesis of intellectual precision and spiritual engagement. The academic study of religion enables students to become critical thinkers and move beyond personal piety into responsible leadership achieving a balance between the particularity of respective faith traditions and a sense of community and global responsibility.

Academic offices
| Preceded by None | President of Brown University; 1765–1791 | Succeeded by Jonathan Maxcy |
