= Isaac Eaton =

Baptist reverend (1724 – 1772)

- Born: 1724; Montgomery Township, Montgomery County, Pennsylvania
- Died: July 4, 1772 (aged 47); Hopewell, New Jersey
- Burial place: Old School Baptist Cemetery
- Known for: Hopewell Academy
- Congregations served: Old School Baptist Church of Hopewell

Reverend Isaac Eaton (1724 – July 4, 1772) was an American minister and educator from the Hopewell section of Hopewell Township, at the time part of Hunterdon County, now Mercer County, New Jersey, United States.

He was the first minister of the Hopewell Baptist Church, also known as the Old School Baptist Church, serving from 1748 until his death in 1772. In 1756, he founded the Hopewell Academy, the first Baptist Latin grammar school in the American colonies. Graduate James Manning became the first president of Brown University.

== Personal life ==
Eaton was born in Montgomery Township of Montgomery County, Pennsylvania in 1724. His father, Reverend Joseph Eaton of the Montgomery Baptist Church, had emigrated from Wales in 1686.

He died on July 4, 1772, and was buried inside the 1748 Hopewell Baptist Church building. His marble tombstone is now affixed to the exterior wall of the 1822 church building, which was built atop the original church. He is presumed buried under the current church building.
