= Mahony & Zvosec =

Defunct architectural firm based in Princeton, New Jersey, US

Mahony & Zvosec, Architects & Planners was an American architectural practice based in Princeton, New Jersey, active in the mid to late-twentieth-century Connecticut, New York, New Jersey, and Pennsylvania. It was established in 1967 by Leo Halpin Mahony, AIA (born 1931), who had previously practiced under the name of Leo H. Mahony (fl. 1962–1967) and John M. Zvosec. The firm practiced out of the Gallup Robinson Building, Research Park, Princeton, New Jersey 08540.

== Works as Mahony & Zvosec ==
- 1969: South Brunswick Township Public Library (South Brunswick, New Jersey)
- 1969: St. Anthony's Church & School (Highstown, New Jersey)
- 1969: St. Luke's Church & Rectory (North Plainfield, New Jersey)
