= Hopewell Academy (Hopewell, New Jersey) =

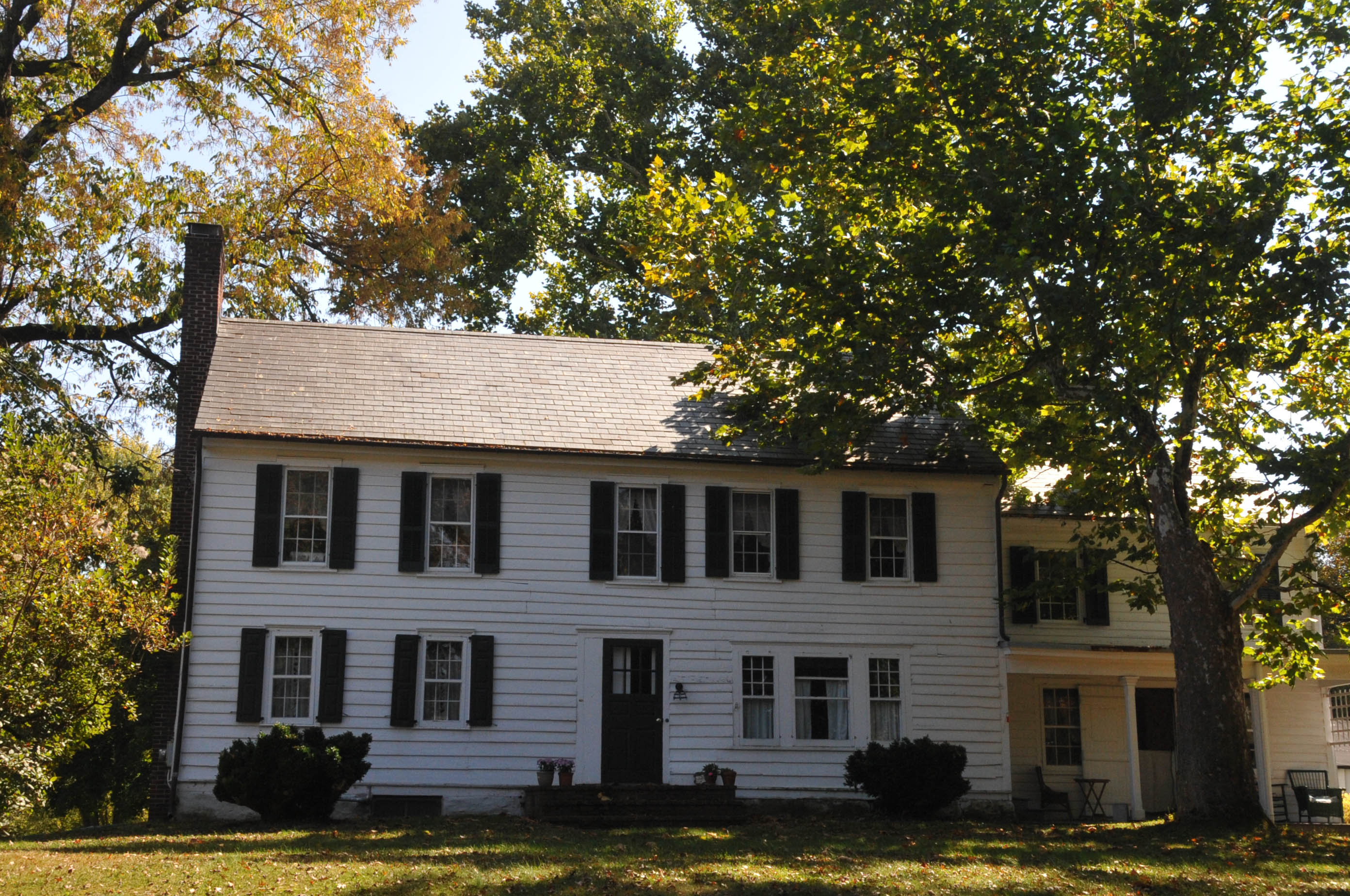

Location
- Hopewell, New Jersey, U.S.
- Coordinates: 40.38838°N 74.76255°W

Information
- Denomination: Baptist
- Established: 1756
- Closed: 1767

Hopewell Academy was a Baptist Latin grammar preparatory school in Hopewell, New Jersey that operated between 1756 and 1767. The academy is noted as the first Baptist educational establishment in the American Colonies. The school was the forerunner of Brown University, with Hopewell alumni James Manning and Hezekiah Smith both playing major roles in the establishment and early administration of the college.

== History ==
In 1756, Reverend Isaac Eaton founded Hopewell Academy in Hopewell, Province of New Jersey "for the education of youth for the ministry." The academy was one of a number established on the model pioneered by the Presbyterian Log College in the Province of Pennsylvania.

The academy was financed by the Philadelphia Baptist Association and the Charleston Baptist Association, who appointed trustees to oversee its affairs

The school operated out of a parsonage house at 19 W. Broad Street. The c. 1750 structure was remodeled in the late 19th century and further modernized in the 20th century. It was documented by the Historic American Buildings Survey (HABS) in 1937. The school closed in 1767.

=== Relationship with Brown University ===
Two alumni of the school played major role in the establishment early administration of Brown University. Minister Hezekiah Smith was an early supporter of the university while James Manning served as the college's first president.

Hopewell Academy's relationship with Brown is analogous to that of the Log College with Princeton University.

== Gallery ==
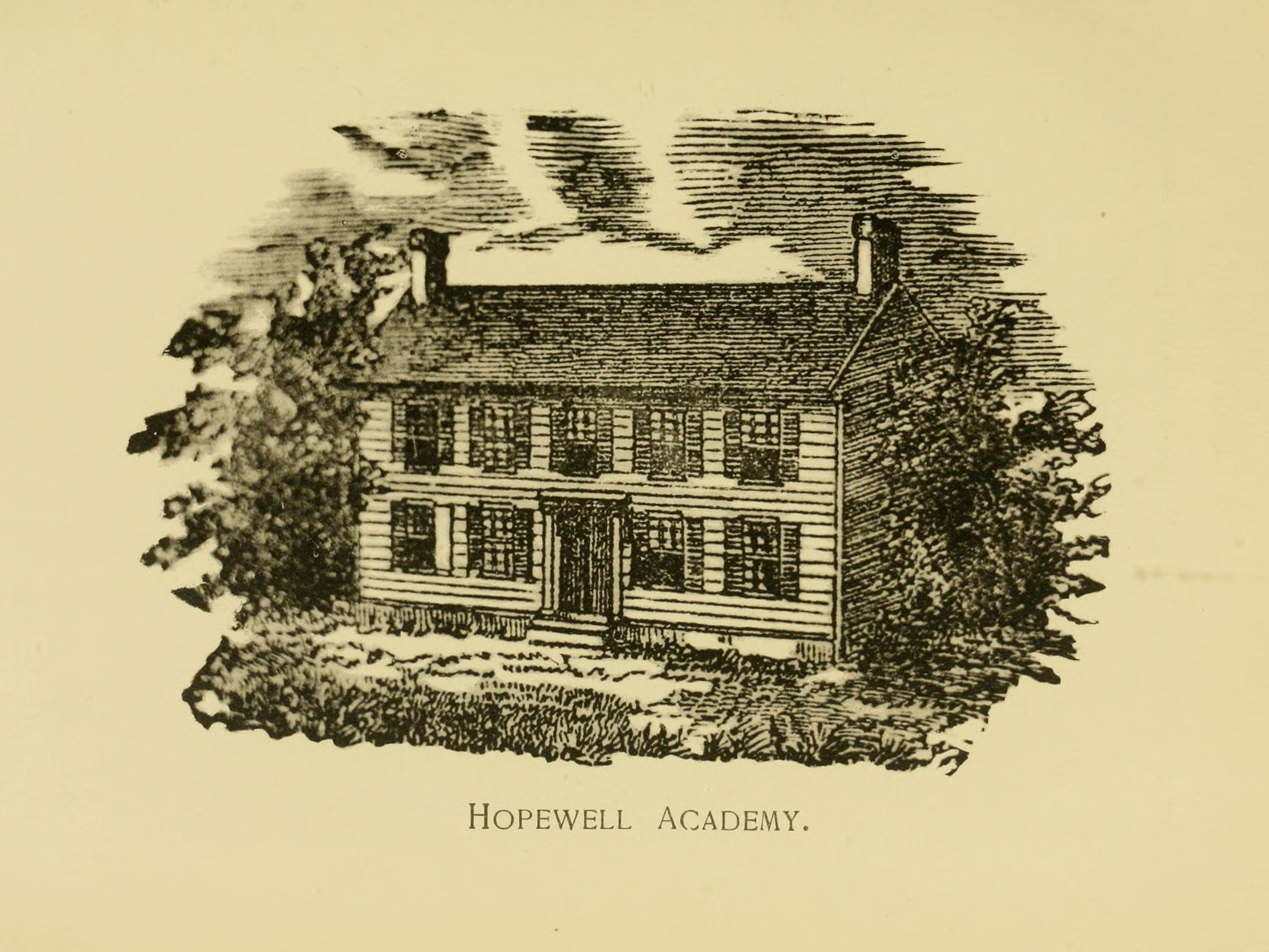
Engraving of the academy building

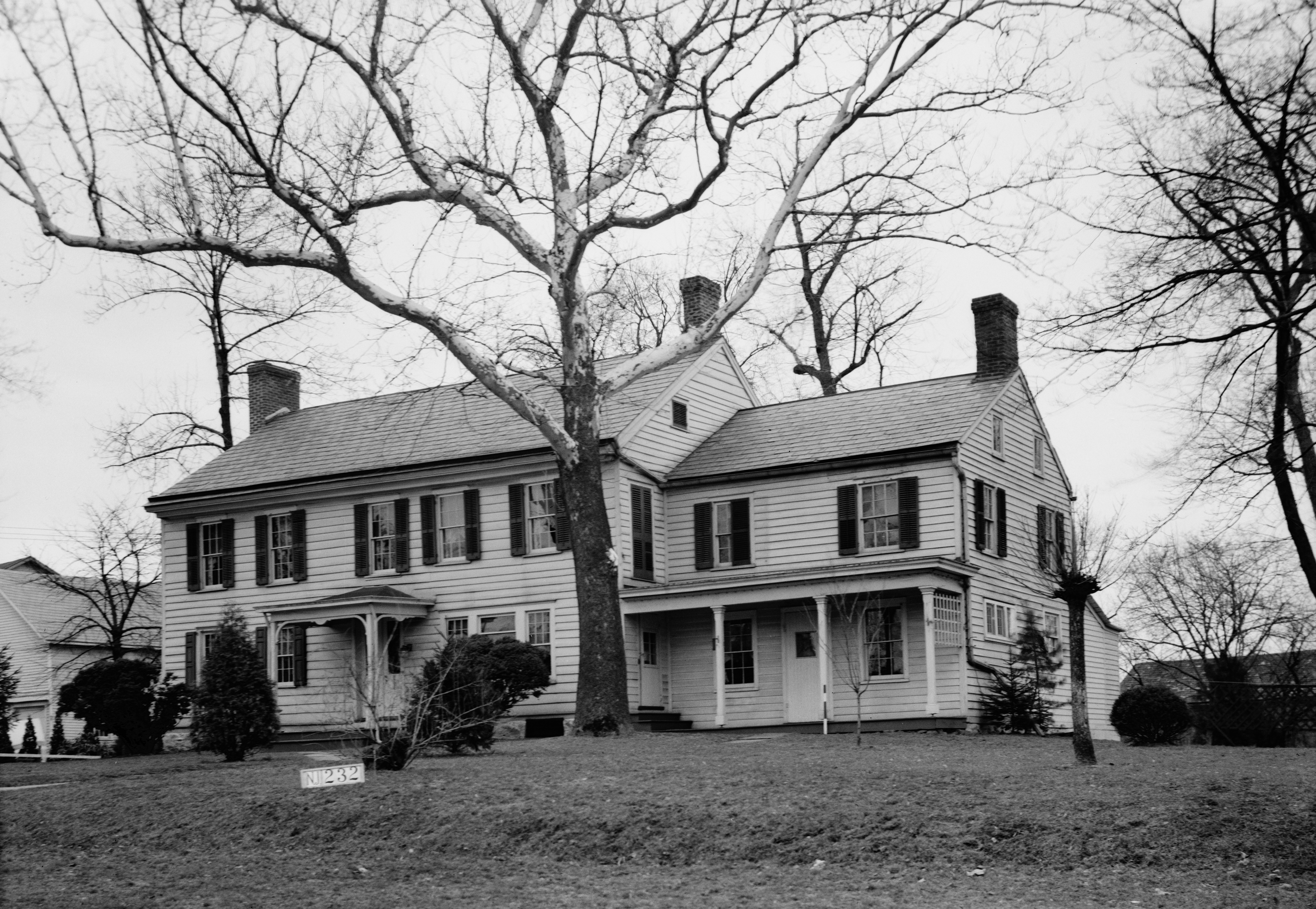
HABS photo from 1937

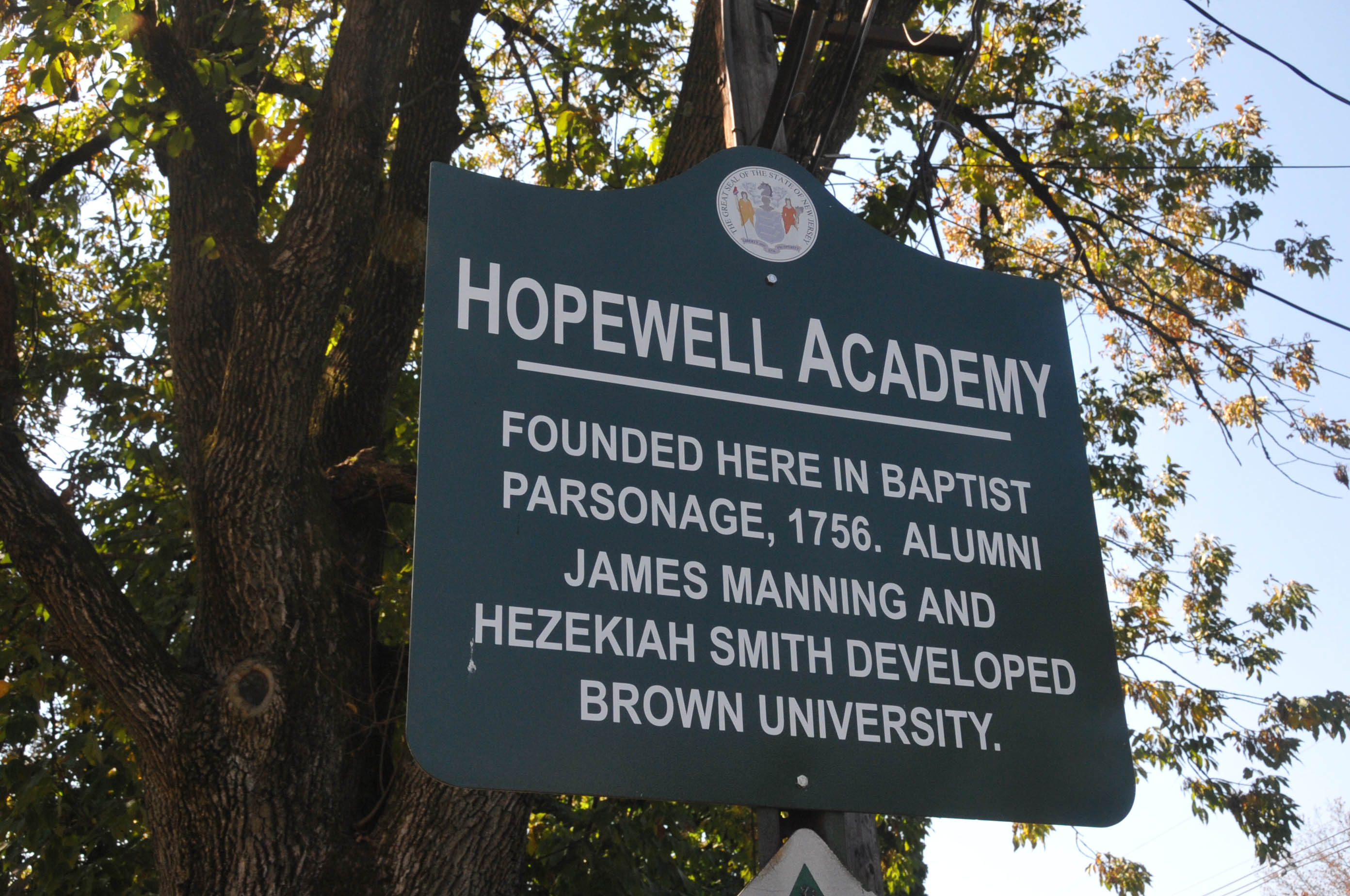
Historical marker at the site

== Alumni ==
- Hezekiah Smith, early supporter of Brown University
- James Manning (1738–1791), first president of Brown University, minister of the First Baptist Church in America

== See also ==
- Baptists in the United States
- History of Brown University
