= Baptists in the United States =

Christian denomination in the United states

As of 2014, about 15.3% of Americans identified as Baptist, making Baptists the second-largest religious group in the United States, after Roman Catholics. By 2020, Baptists had become the third-largest religious group in the United States, with the rise of nondenominational Protestantism. Most modern Baptists generally adhere to a congregational church polity, so local congregations are independent and ultimately autonomous, meaning that their religious beliefs vary but are broadly Christian. Baptists account for about one-third of all Protestants in the United States: some mainline, many evangelical. Divisions have resulted in numerous Baptist bodies, some with historical lineage and others more modernly organized. Many Baptists operate independently or practice their faith in entirely independent congregations.

English Baptists migrated to the American colonies during the seventeenth century. Baptist theological reflection informed how the colonists understood their presence in the New World, especially in Rhode Island through the preaching of Roger Williams, John Clarke, and others. During the 18th century, the Great Awakening resulted in the conversion of many slaves to Baptist churches, although they were often segregated and relegated to lower status within Baptist churches. Although Baptists opposed slavery during this period, many later Baptists in the South remained slave holders and still others considered it a political decision and not a moral issue.

The Philadelphia Baptist Association established the first national body, the Triennial Convention, on May 18, 1814. In 1845, the Southern Baptist Convention—today's largest U.S.-based Baptist denomination—split from the Triennial Convention, who refused to ordain missionaries that had slaves. After abolition, large black Baptist churches formed due to continued racial segregation. Today, the largest denominations among African Americans are the National Baptist Convention and the Progressive National Baptist Convention.

== History ==
=== 17th century ===
Baptists appeared in the American Colonies in the early 17th century among settlers from England and Wales. Theologically all Baptists insisted that the sacrament of Baptism was the key rite to enter the visible Church and could not be administered to infants. However some followed the Arminian doctrine that says God's saving Grace is available to everyone, and others followed the Calvinist doctrine that says Grace was available only to the predestined "elect".

==== Rhode Island and Providence Plantations ====
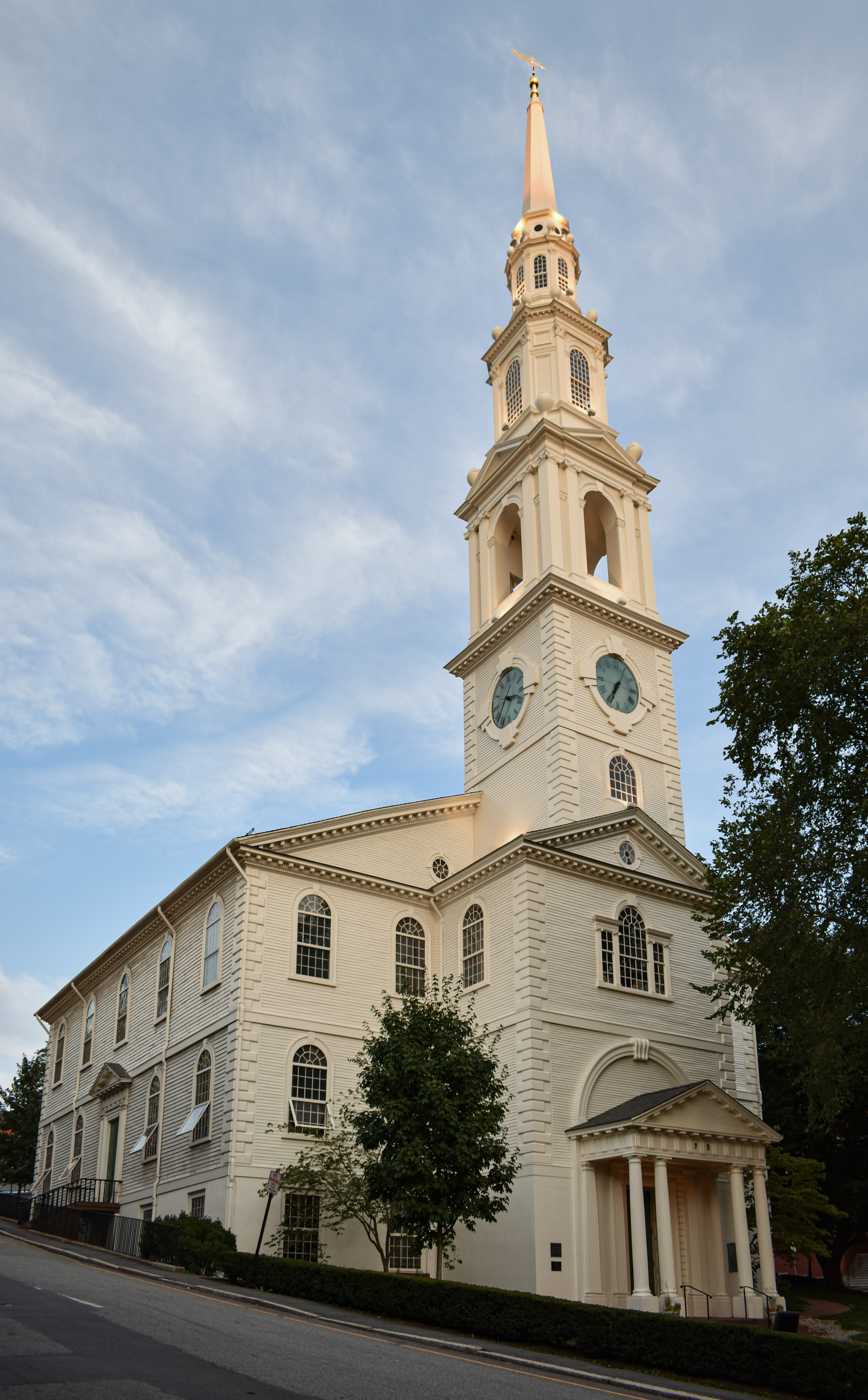
In 1636 Roger Williams founded the First Baptist Church in America in Providence, Rhode Island. It remains the first and oldest congregation in the United States. The chapel dates from 1775

Roger Williams and John Clarke are credited with bringing the Baptist tradition to America. In 1638, Williams established the First Baptist Church of Providence in the city of Providence, Rhode Island and Clarke was the local cleric at Newport, Rhode Island when he established the First Baptist Church of Newport before 1644. The earlier origins of the Providence church was undisputed until 1847 when a minister of the Newport church claimed that the church was the older one. According to a Baptist historian who has researched the matter extensively, "There is much debate over the centuries as to whether the Providence or Newport church deserved the place of 'first' Baptist congregation in America. Exact records for both congregations are lacking." Today, almost without exception Baptist historians agree that the Providence church came first. In 1764, the leading Baptist ministers in colonial America Rev. James Manning, Rev. Isaac Backus, Rev. Samuel Stillman, Rev. Morgan Edwards and Rev. John Gano founded The College in the English Colony of Rhode Island and Providence Plantations, nowadays known as Brown University, the seventh institution of higher education in the original Thirteen Colonies, with the specific goal of serving as a Baptist university and sanctuary for all religious groups, specially Baptists that were not widely welcomed at other institutions which were closely associated with the Congregationalist churches (Harvard College, Yale College, and the College of New Jersey) and the Church of England (the Academy of Philadelphia, King's College and the College of William and Mary).

==== Early controversies ====
Beginning in Providence in 1636–1637, Roger Williams and John Clarke founded a colony in which religious affiliation and citizenship were separated. This same principle was continued in the first charter of 1644 and affirmed by the newly created colonial government in 1647. This principle was explicitly affirmed in the Charter of 1663 which John Clarke wrote and secured. Rhode Island and Providence Plantations was regarded by the neighboring colonies with undisguised horror, and Massachusetts Bay, Plymouth, and Connecticut spent the next 100 years trying to dismember the "heretic" colony. The other colonies passed laws to outlaw Baptists and Quakers, leading to the hanging of four Quakers in Massachusetts. When Harvard's first president Henry Dunster abandoned Congregationalist ideas in favor of Baptist tenets in 1653, he provoked a controversy that highlighted two distinct approaches to dealing with dissent in the Massachusetts Bay Colony. The colony's Puritan leaders, whose own religion was born of dissent from mainstream Church of England, generally worked for reconciliation with members who questioned matters of Congregationalist theology but responded much more harshly to outright rejection of Congregationalism. Dunster's conflict with the colony's magistrates began when he failed to have his infant son baptized, believing, as a newly converted Baptist, that only believers should be baptized. Efforts to restore Dunster to the former ideas failed, and his "apostasy" proved untenable to colony leaders who had entrusted him, in his job as Harvard's president, to uphold the colony's religious mission. Thus, he represented a threat to the stability of theocratic society. Dunster exiled himself in 1654 and moved to nearby Plymouth Colony, where he died in 1658.

=== 18th century ===
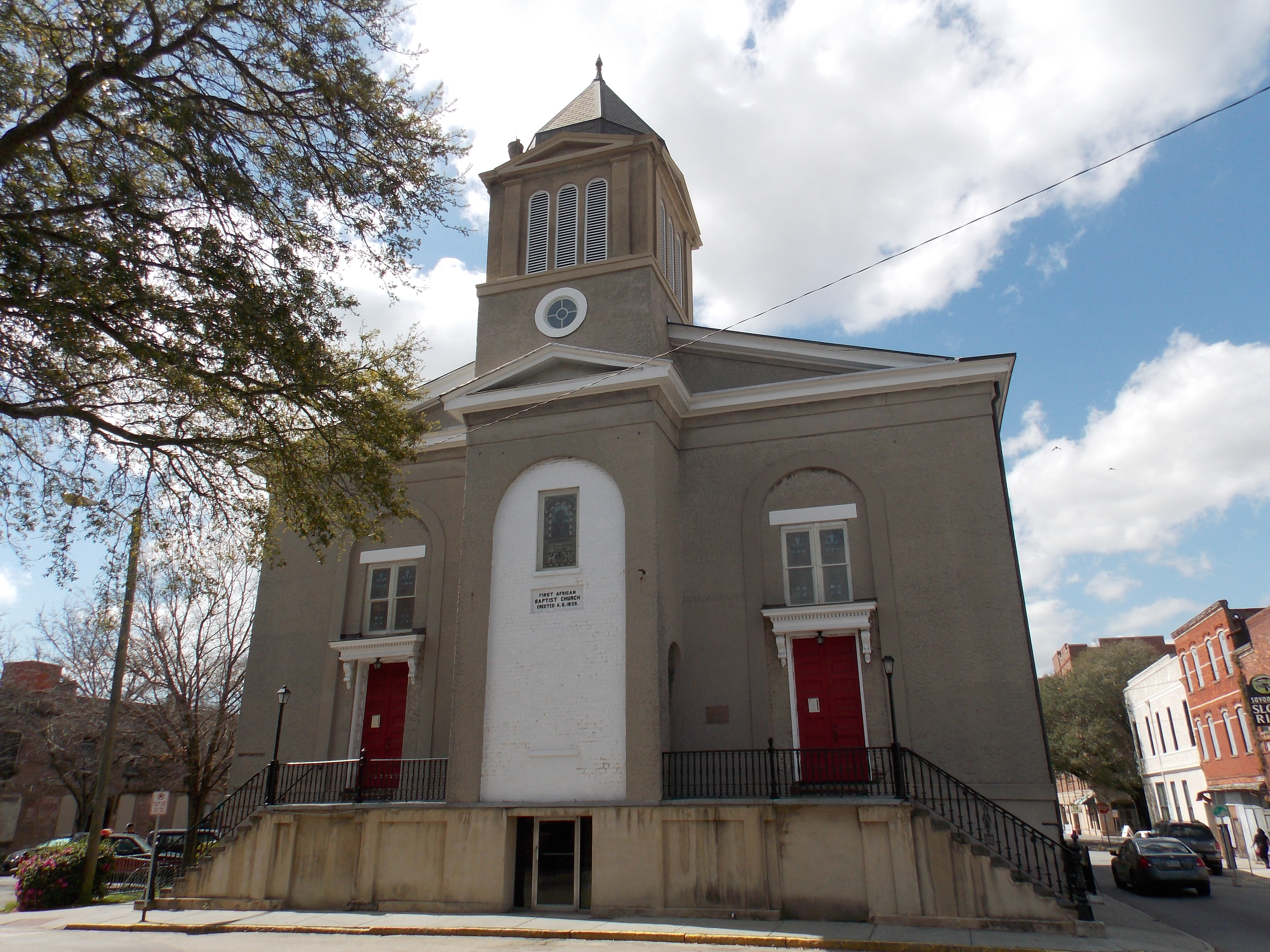
The First African Baptist Church of Savannah is one of the oldest Black Baptist congregations in the United States.

The First African Baptist Church of Savannah, Georgia was founded in 1774.

Before the American Revolution about 494 Baptist congregations existed in the United States. That number had risen to 1152 U.S. Baptist congregations by 1795.

==== Revolutionary Virginia ====
Isaac (1974) analyzes the rise of the Baptist Church in Virginia, with emphasis on evangelicalism and social life. There was a sharp contrast between the austerity of the plain-living Baptists and the opulence of the Anglican planters, who controlled local government. Baptist church discipline, mistaken by the gentry for radicalism, served to ameliorate disorder. The struggle for religious toleration erupted and played out during the American Revolution, as the Baptists worked to disestablish the Anglican church. Beeman (1978) explores the conflict in one Virginia locality, showing that as population became more dense, the county court and the Anglican Church increased their authority. The Baptists protested vigorously; the resulting social disorder resulted chiefly from the ruling gentry's disregard of public need. The vitality of the religious opposition made the conflict between 'evangelical' and 'gentry' styles a bitter one. Kroll-Smith (1984) suggests the strength of the evangelical movement's organization determined its ability to mobilize power outside the conventional authority structure.

In 1793, the Virginia Baptist General Committee, composed of representatives from Baptist institutions from across Virginia, passed a resolution that slavery was not a moral or religious issue and thus decisions surrounding slavery should be left up to politicians.

==== Slavery in Baptist churches ====
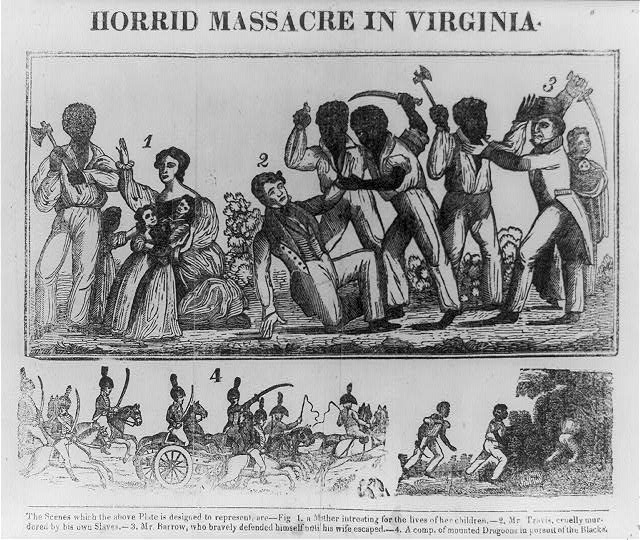
An 1831 slave rebellion was led by Nat Turner, a Baptist preacher operating out of a hush harbor.

In the 1770s, White Baptists went on conversion missions in the Southern United States as a part of the period known as a Great Awakening. The concept of equality in the eyes of God caused many slaves to convert to the Baptist faith, however, slaves were still urged by white clergy to remain obedient to their masters. Out of fear that Black churches would lead to rebellion, white slave owners required converted slaves to attend white churches. The result of this was the creation of "hush harbors" where slaves would secretly blend Christianity with their African religions and practices, creating their own communities. Some of these spaces were also used to plot against slaveowners, such as the 1831 rebellion in Virginia led by Nat Turner, a Baptist preacher in his community.

=== Missionary organizations ===
The International Ministries was founded in 1814 as the Baptist Board for Foreign Missions by the Triennial Convention (now American Baptist Churches USA). The first mission of the organization took place in Burma with the missionaries Adoniram Judson and Ann Hasseltine Judson in 1814. Other missions that followed took place in Siam in 1833, India in 1840, China in 1842, Japan in 1872 and Philippines in 1900.

==== Slavery and racial segregation ====
In 19th century Virginia, slaves applying for membership in Baptist churches were required to get written approval from their master to join a congregation. Once they were a part of the congregation Black members would have separate Black deacons who oversaw them.

The Baptist churches in America, like the country, split in two over the issue of slavery in the United States.

In 1840, the Board of Managers of the Baptist General Convention for Foreign Missions repeated that the slavery question, which it never mentions by name, is not relevant to their work. It already speaks of the question of "the continuance of Christian fellowship between northern and southern churches."

In 1841, at the annual meeting in Baltimore, "leading ministers and members of the Denomination had signed a document repudiating the course of anti-slavery Baptists, and pronouncing the disfellowship of slaveholders an innovation unsanctioned by the usages of the denomination." There was set up an American Baptist Free Mission Society in 1842, whose founding President was Cyrus Pitt Grosvenor.

Struggling to gain a foothold in the South, after the American Revolution, the next generation of Southern Baptist preachers accommodated themselves to the leadership of Southern society. Rather than challenging the gentry on slavery and urging manumission (as did the Quakers and Methodists), they began to interpret the Bible as supporting the practice of slavery and encouraged good paternalistic practices by slaveholders. They preached to slaves to accept their places and obey their masters. In the two decades after the Revolution during the Second Great Awakening, Baptist preachers abandoned their pleas that slaves be manumitted.

When the Alabama State Convention called on the Foreign Mission Board to explicitly allow slaveholders as missionaries, the board responded:

If...any one should offer himself as a missionary, having slaves, and should insist on retaining them as his property, we could not appoint him. One thing is certain, we can never be a party to any arrangement which would imply approbation of slavery.

— Foreign Mission Board, in Albert Henry Newman, A History of the Baptist Churches in the United States, page 447

In Baptist churches in both free and slaveholding states during this period, people of color were required to sit in a segregated "negro pew" regardless of whether they were members of the church, were licensed ministers, or even were invited into the pews of other white churchgoers.

==== Southern Baptist Convention ====
In 1844, the Home Mission Society, the national missionary society of the Triennial Convention, stated that missionaries could not have or keep slaves as property. This caused Southern regional associations and state conventions to split from the denomination, influenced by the Georgia Baptist Convention. In May 1845, they formed the Southern Baptist Convention in Augusta, Georgia.

In 1872, Henry Tupper of the Southern Baptist Convention's Foreign Mission Board appointed Edmonia Moon for missionary service. She was the first woman to receive this honor. In 1888, the Woman's Missionary Union was instituted. Women were recognized and encouraged to form missionary circles and children's bands in churches and Sunday Schools.

=== Formation of the Black Baptist convention ===
During Reconstruction, policies and practices such as literacy tests, poll taxes, and racial violence lead to the continued disenfranchisement of freed slaves in the South. According to author Evelyn Brooks Higginbotham, it was this lack of political power and other liberties which led the Black church to become a source of community, education, economic power, leadership, and development in post Civil War America.

In 1895, the National Baptist Convention, USA was formed.

=== 20th century ===
==== Growth of the Black Baptist convention ====
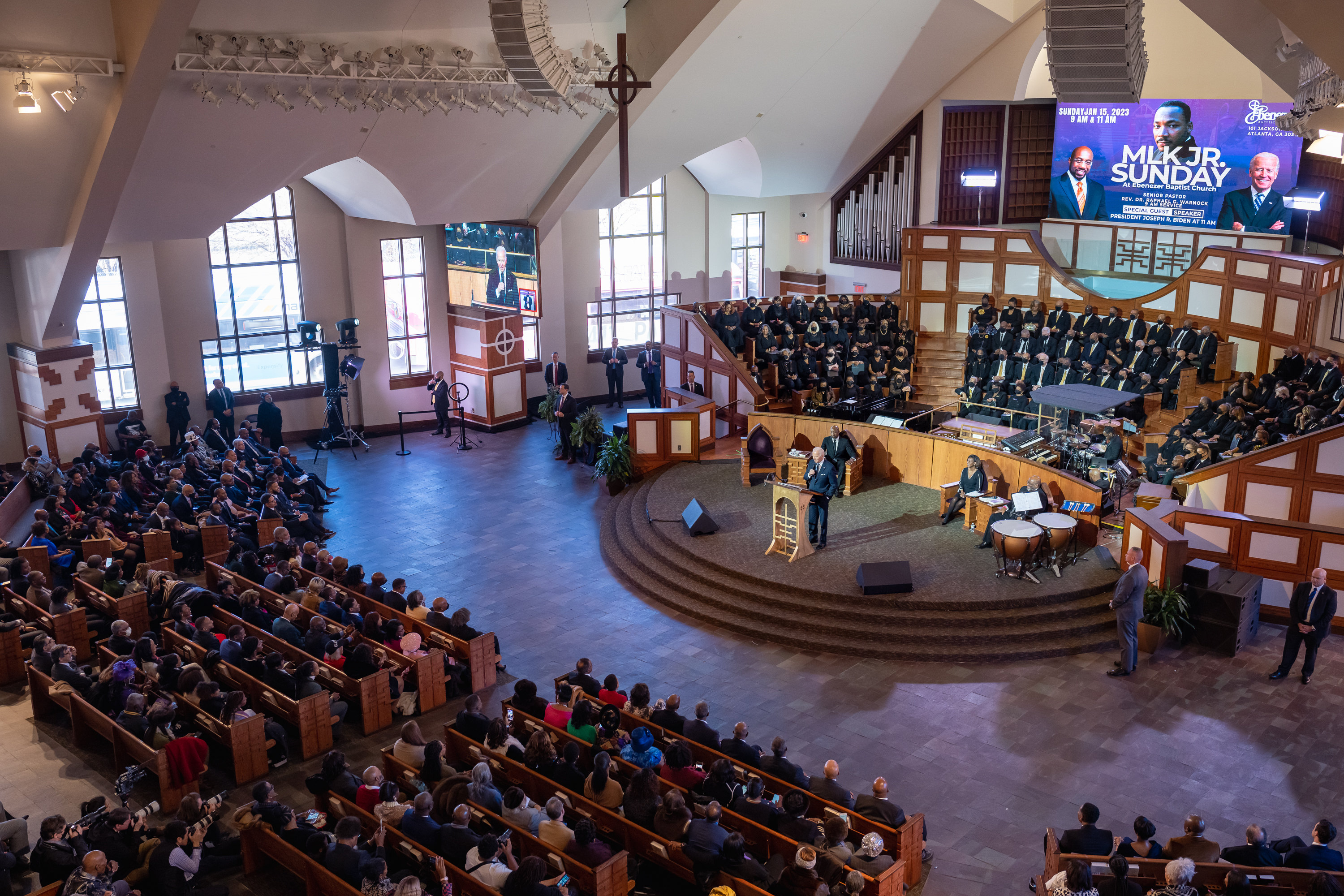
Service in Ebenezer Baptist Church located in Atlanta, Georgia, with President Biden speaking, in 2023.

In 1906, the National Baptist Convention, USA had 2,261,607 members, representing 61.4% of all Black churchgoers in the country. By 1916, that number had grown to 2,938,579, a membership larger than either the Northern or Southern Baptist conventions had at the time. According to a census published by the Baptist World Alliance in 2023, it self-reported a total of 21,145 churches and 8,415,100 members, although the Association of Religion Data Archives reported a membership of 1,567,741 in 2020.

== Organization ==
Although modern Baptist local churches are independent, Baptists have traditionally organized themselves in a structure of regional associations, with their assemblies, and a general assembly for collective edification, order, consultation, and ministerial support. The constituency of these associations is based on geographical and doctrinal criteria. Many such associations of Baptist churches have developed in the United States since Baptists first came to the continent.

Until the early 19th century these Baptist regional associations tended to center on a local or small area where the constituent churches could conveniently assemble. However, beginning with the spread of the Philadelphia Baptist Association beyond its original bounds and the rise of the modern missions movement, Baptists began to move towards developing state-wide and nation-wide body.

The first national body was the Triennial Convention, founded in the early 19th century, which assembled every three years in Philadelphia. The Triennial Convention was a loose organization with the purpose of raising funds for its autonomous societies with specific focus, such as women, education, missions etc.)

Over the years, other national bodies have originated as schisms from the Triennial Convention. There are a few smaller associations that have never identified with any of the national organizations, as well as many Independent Baptist churches that are not part of any type of organization.

== Church-state separation ==
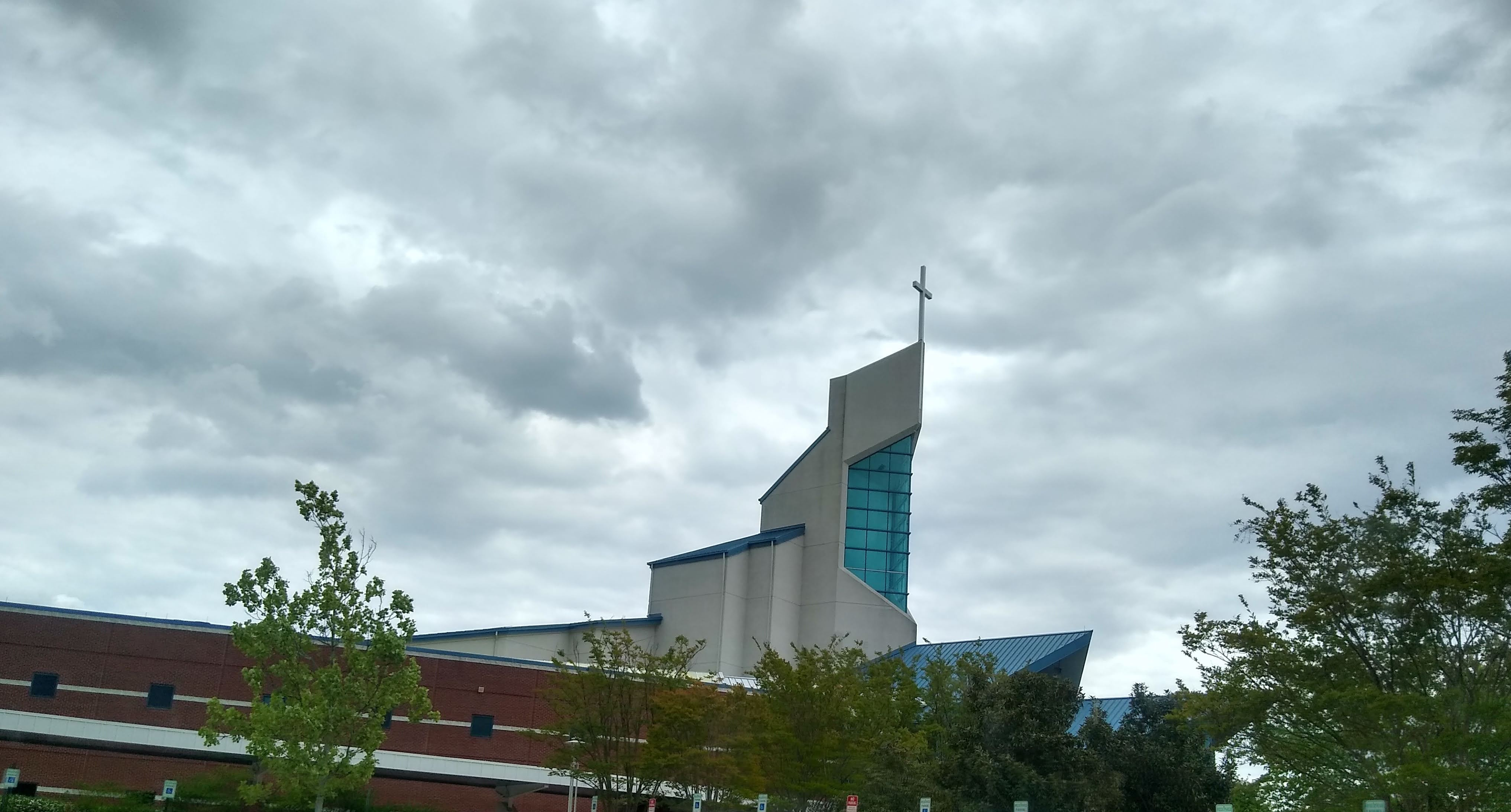
First Baptist Church of Glenarden located in Upper Marlboro, Maryland, affiliated with Converge.

In the United States, there are some Baptist groups that support and actively attempt to maintain the separation of the church from state. At least 14 Baptist bodies, including the American Baptist Churches USA, Cooperative Baptist Fellowship, the Baptist General Convention of Texas, and the National Baptist Convention, USA, Inc. financially and ideologically support the mission of the Baptist Joint Committee for Religious Liberty. This organization tries to uphold a concept of political philosophy that many Baptists leaders have taught and defended, since Thomas Helwys. On the issue of school prayer, for instance, the Baptist Joint Committee argues that prayer is most pleasing to God when offered voluntarily, not when the government compels its observance.

== Major Baptist denominations in the U.S. ==
Baptist Denomination in the United States
Convention	Denomination	Members	Churches	Founding Year
Mainline	Alliance of Baptists (formerly Southern Baptist Alliance)	65,000	127	1987
Evangelical	American Baptist Association	100,000	1,644	1924
Mainline	American Baptist Churches USA (ABCUSA; formerly the Triennial Convention)	1,145,647	5,057	1814
Evangelical	Confessional Baptist Association (formerly Association of Reformed Baptists in America)			
Mainline	Association of Welcoming and Affirming Baptists			
Independent Baptist	Baptist Bible Fellowship International	110,000	4,000	1950
	Baptist Missionary Association of America (formerly North American Baptist Association)	137,909	1,272	1950
	Central Baptist Association	3297	35	
	Christian Unity Baptist Association	345	5	1901
Evangelical	Venture Church Network (formerly the Conservative Baptist Association of America)	200,000	1,200	1947
	Continental Baptist Churches			
Evangelical	Converge (formerly Baptist General Conference, Swedish Baptist Church in America, Swedish Baptist Conference)	147,500	1,071	1852
Mainline	Cooperative Baptist Fellowship (CBF)		1800	1991
	Enterprise Association of Regular Baptists	4,700	58	1894
	Full Gospel Baptist Church Fellowship			
	Fundamental Baptist Fellowship Association			
	Fundamental Baptist Fellowship of America		600	1967
	General Association of Baptists (formerly Duck River and Kindred Associations)	10,672	102	1826
	General Association of General Baptists	61,040	1,154	1820
Evangelical	General Association of Regular Baptist Churches	132,700	1,321	1922
	General Conference of the Evangelical Baptist Church, Inc. (formerly Church of the Full Gospel, Inc.)	2,200	31	1935
	General Six-Principle Baptists	175	7	1653
	Independent Baptist Church of America	25	2	1927
	Independent Baptist Fellowship International		540	1984
	Independent Baptist Fellowship of North America	250	0	1990
	Independent Free Will Baptist	22,000	295	
	Institutional Missionary Baptist Conference of America			
	Interstate & Foreign Landmark Missionary Baptist Association			
	Landmark Baptists			
	Liberty Baptist Fellowship		100	
Evangelical	National Association of Free Will Baptists	185,798	2,369	1935
Historically Black	National Baptist Convention of America, Inc.	1,700,000	6,716	1880
Historically Black	National Baptist Convention, USA, Inc.	5,197,512	10,358	1915
Evangelical	National Baptist Evangelical Life and Soul Saving Assembly of the U.S.A.	57,674	264	1920
Historically Black	National Missionary Baptist Convention of America	2,500,000	701	1988
Historically Black	National Primitive Baptist Convention (formerly Colored Primitive Baptist Church)	600,000	1,565	1907
	New Testament Association of Independent Baptist Churches		104	1965
Evangelical	North American Baptist Conference (formerly General Conference of German Baptist Churches in North America)	47,150	272	1843
	Old-Line Primitive Baptists			
	Old Missionary Baptist	16,289	73	
	Old Regular Baptist	15,000	326	1892
	Original Free Will Baptist Convention	33,066	236	1961
	Pentecostal Free Will Baptist Church		150	1959
	Primitive Baptist Universalists			
	Primitive Baptists	72,000	1,000	1827
Historically Black	Progressive National Baptist Convention	1,010,000	1,500	1961
	Progressive Primitive Baptists			
	Reformed Baptist	8,000	200	1967
	Regular Baptist	17,186	266	1854
	Separate Baptist			
	Separate Baptists in Christ	10,000	101	1912
Evangelical	Seventh Day Baptist General Conference	6,300	97	1801
Evangelical	Southern Baptist Convention	16,136,044	45,727	1845
	Southwide Baptist Fellowship	1,847	912	1956
	Sovereign Grace Baptists	4,000	350	1980
	Strict Baptists		3	
	Two-Seed-in-the-Spirit Predestinarian Baptists	201	16	
Historically Black	United American Free Will Baptist Church	100,000	836	1901
Historically Black	United American Free Will Baptist Conference		35	1968
	United Baptist	63,641	586	1786
	World Baptist Fellowship		945	1932

In addition, there are many Independent Baptist churches not aligned with any group.

=== Evangelical Baptist Conventions ===
According to the Pew Research Center's 2014 Religious Landscape Study, 9.2% of Americans belong to Evangelical Baptist congregations. These include the Southern Baptist Convention (5.3%), the Independent Convention (2.5%), the Missionary Convention (less than 0.3%), the Conservative Baptist Association of America (less than 0.3%), the Free Will Convention (less than 0.3%), the General Assembly of Regular Baptists (less than 0.3%), and other evangelical conventions (1%). In 2006, the Southern Baptist Convention (SBC) was the largest non-Catholic denomination in the United States.

=== Historically Black Baptist churches ===
Before the American Civil War, most black American Baptists were, with some notable exceptions, members of the same churches as the whites (though often relegated to a segregated status within the church). After the war they left the white churches to start separate churches and associations.

Today there are several historically African-American groups in the United States, including the National Baptist Convention, USA, Inc., the National Baptist Convention of America, and others. A good number of African-American Baptist churches are dually aligned with a traditionally African American group and the ABCUSA, the Southern Baptist Convention, or the Cooperative Baptist Fellowship.

According to a Pew Research survey conducted in 2014, 4% of Americans belong to historically Black Baptist congregations, including the National Baptist Convention (1.4%), the Progressive Convention (0.3%), the Missionary Convention (0.3%), Independent Conventions (less than 0.3%), and other historically Black conventions (1.8%).

=== Mainline Baptist Conventions ===
According to a 2014 Pew Research survey, 2.1% of Americans belonged to Mainline Baptist congregations. These include the American Baptist Churches USA (1.5%) and other mainline Baptist conventions (0.6%).

=== Independent (non-aligned) Baptist churches ===
Independent Baptist churches are completely independent of any association or group, though they usually maintain some sort of fellowship with like-minded churches. They share the traditional Baptist doctrinal distinctives, but they adhere to what they see as a Biblical principle of churches' individuality.

Independent Baptists believe that this approach to ministry leaves pastors and people in the church free to work as a local ministry, instead of national work, which, in their view, can be less efficient.

Independent Baptists are strictly Biblicist in their theology, adhering to the traditional Baptist understanding of the Bible and of faith. The same doctrinal variations that exist within (or between) the Baptist associations exist among Independent Baptists.

== Baptist educational institutions ==
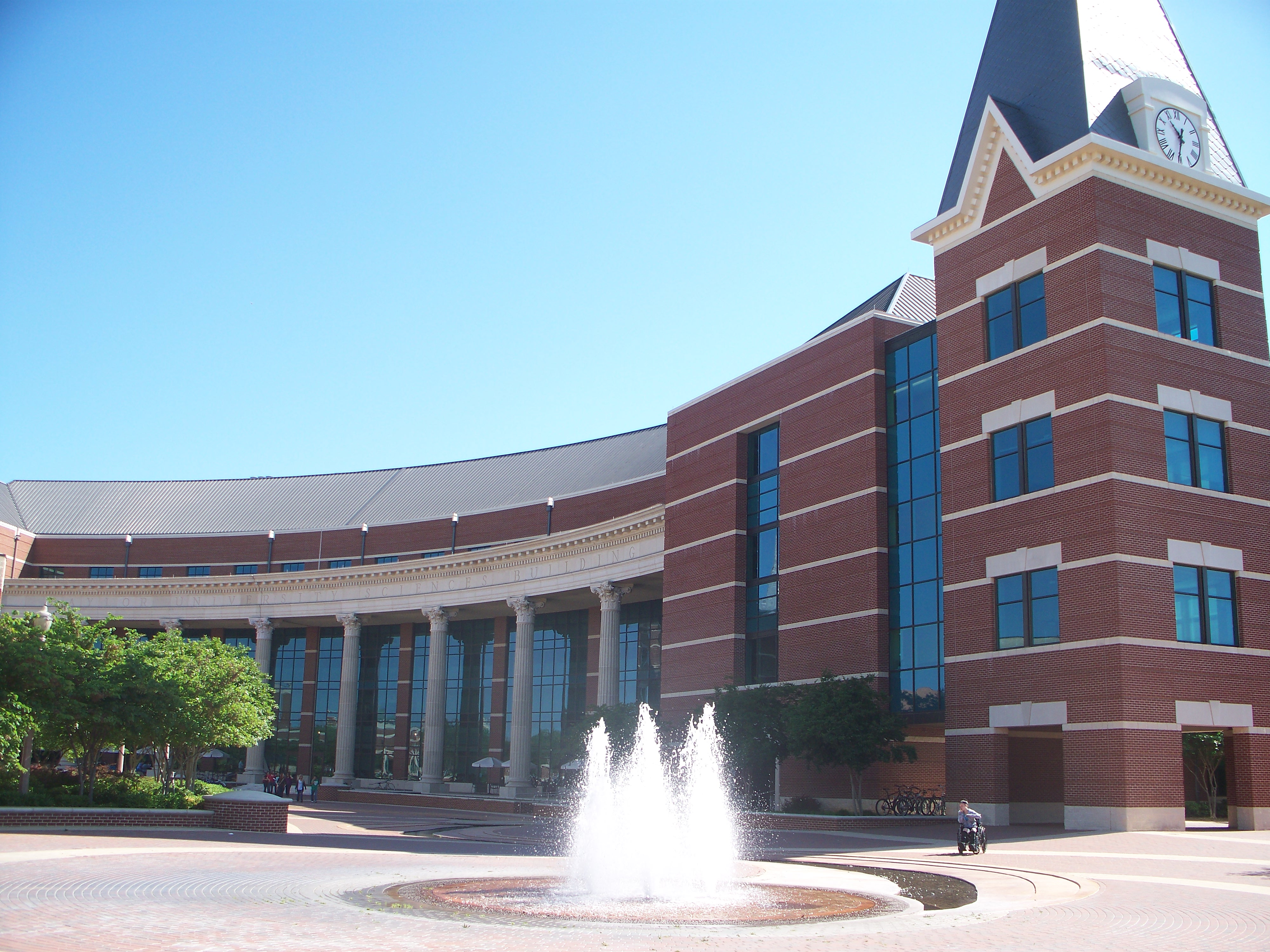
Baylor University in Waco, Texas, affiliated with the Baptist General Convention of Texas.

Since the founding of Brown University in Providence, Rhode Island in 1764, Baptists have founded various institutions around the United States to assist congregants in Biblical literacy and to train clergy educated in the Bible and the original Biblical languages. Some of these schools such as Brown University and Bates College eventually became secularized, but others have maintained close bonds with their original founding groups and goals. In 2006, the International Association of Baptist Colleges and Universities was founded. In 2023, it had 42 member universities in the United States.

== Demographics ==
In a study published in 2014, using data from The National Survey of American Life: Coping with Stress in the 21st Century (NSAL), 49.08% of African American respondents identified as Baptist. In a 2001 ABC News/Beliefnet poll, 48% of Black Americans and 13% of White Americans identified as Baptist.

2014 Racial Demographics
	White	Black	Latino	Asian	Other
Evangelical	85%	4%	5%	1%	5%
Mainline	76%	8%	9%	1%	6%
Historically Black	<1%	98%	2%	<1%	<1%

2014 Age Demographics
	18-29	30-49	50-64	65+
Evangelical	15%	30%	31%	24%
Mainline	24%	29%	29%	19%
Historically Black	18%	33%	32%	16%

2014 Gender Demographics
	Female	Male
Evangelical	52%	48%
Mainline	56%	44%
Historically Black	61%	39%

2014 Education Demographics
	High School or Less	Some College	College Degree	Graduate Degree
Evangelical	48%	34%	12%	6%
Mainline	59%	28%	9%	4%
Historically Black	57%	30%	9%	5%

== Baptist image in United States ==
According to a 2003 survey, at least half of Americans have a negative view of the Baptist faith.

To avoid being mistakenly associated with fundamentalist groups, many moderate Baptist churches have adopted names such as "Community Church" or "Community Chapel" that leave out the denomination's name. This fits into a general trend by church planters from many denominations to de-accentuate their denomination's name.

Many independent Baptist congregations are staunch fundamentalists, regarding all Baptist associations as too liberal for them to join. Many of these congregations have a history of employing evangelism techniques that critics consider too extreme and abrasive for modern American culture.

=== Criticism of Baptist churches ===
==== Racism and lack of diversity ====
Racial diversity and attitudes towards race tend to vary by congregation as Baptist churches tend to only be loosely associated with one another. However a 1999 study concluded only 8% of Christian churches had no single race making up more than 80% of the congregation. This same year, a study on Southern Baptist churches concluded that the mean Simpson's Diversity Index for race in the Southern Baptists Church was 0.098, with 0 being perfect homogeneity and 1 being complete evenness. It was also concluded that the average Southern Baptist church had more than 90% non-Hispanic White members. However, the 22.6% of Southern Baptist churches that employed small groups had greater diversity than those that did not. A 1998 case study found that theologically liberal congregations were no more likely than their conservative counterparts to foster racial diversity, but that instead placing emphasis on local growth, community mindsets, and inclusivity impacted the ability of Baptist churches to attract a multiracial congregation.

== See also ==
- Baptists
- Baptists in Canada
- Racial segregation of churches in the United States

== Bibliography ==
- Harrison, Paul M. Authority and Power in the Free Church Tradition: A Social Case Study of the American Baptist Convention Princeton University Press, 1959.
- Heyrman, Christine Leigh. Southern Cross: The Beginnings of the Bible Belt (1997).
- Isaac, Rhy. "Evangelical Revolt: The Nature of the Baptists' Challenge to the Traditional Order in Virginia, 1765 to 1775," William and Mary Quarterly, 31 (July 1974), 345–68. in JSTOR
- Johnson, Charles A. The Frontier Camp Meeting: Religion's Harvest Time (1955) online edition
- Kidd, Thomas S. and Barry Hankins. Baptists in America: A History (2015)
- Leonard, Bill J. Baptist Ways: A History (2003), comprehensive international history
- Leonard, Bill J. Baptists in America. (2005), general survey and history by leading Southern Baptist
- Leonard, Bill J. (1987). "Independent Baptists: from Sectarian Minority to 'Moral Majority'". Church History. 56 (4): 504+. Archived from the original on 2011-06-04 – via Questia.
- Najar, Monica. Evangelizing the South: A Social History of Church and State in Early America (2008). 252 pp.
- Pestana, Carla Gardina. Quakers and Baptists in Colonial Massachusetts (2004) excerpt and text search
- Rawlyk, George. Champions of the Truth: Fundamentalism, Modernism, and the Maritime Baptists (1990), on Baptists in Canada.
- Spain, Rufus. At Ease in Zion: Social History of Southern Baptists, 1865-1900 (1967)
- Spangler, Jewel L. (2001). "Becoming Baptists: Conversion in Colonial and Early National Virginia". Journal of Southern History. 67 (2): 243+. Archived from the original on 2011-06-04 – via Questia.
- Stringer, Phil. The Faithful Baptist Witness, Landmark Baptist Press, 1998.
- Torbet, Robert G. A History of the Baptists, Judson Press, 1950.
- Underwood, A. C. A History of the English Baptists. London: Kingsgate Press, 1947.
- Wills, Gregory A. (1997). Democratic Religion: Freedom, Authority, and Church Discipline in the Baptist South, 1785–1900. Archived from the original on 2009-03-24 – via Questia.

=== Black Baptists ===
- Gavins; Raymond. The Perils and Prospects of Southern Black Leadership: Gordon Blaine Hancock, 1884–1970 Duke University Press, 1977.
- Harvey, Paul (1997). Redeeming the South: Religious Cultures and Racial Identities among Southern Baptists, 1865–1925. University of North Carolina Press. Archived from the original on 2011-06-04 – via Questia.
- Pitts, Walter F. Old Ship of Zion: The Afro-Baptist Ritual in the African Diaspora Oxford University Press, 1996.

=== Primary sources ===
- McBeth, H. Leon, (ed.) A Sourcebook for Baptist Heritage (1990), primary sources for Baptist history.
- McGlothlin, W. J. (ed.) Baptist Confessions of Faith. Philadelphia: The American Baptist Publication Society, 1911.
- Underhill, Edward Bean (ed.). Confessions of Faith and Other Documents of the Baptist Churches of England in the 17th century. London: The Hanserd Knollys Society, 1854.
