= Wisconsin Fellowship of Baptist Churches =

Organisation of independent Baptist churches in Wisconsin, USA

The Wisconsin Fellowship of Baptist Churches (WFBC) is an organization of fundamental independent Baptist churches in the U.S. state of Wisconsin.

This fellowship began in 1950 as the Conservative Baptist Association of Wisconsin. This association was sympathetic to, but not officially affiliated with, the Conservative Baptist Association of America, an association organized because of what many felt was growing liberalism in the old Northern Baptist Convention. At its annual meeting in 1969, the Conservative Baptist Association of Wisconsin changed its name to Wisconsin Fellowship of Baptist Churches. WFBC offices are located in Johnson Creek, Wisconsin.
