= National Missionary Baptist Convention of America =

American Christian denomination (1988-)

- Classification: Protestant
- Orientation: Baptist
- Scripture: Protestant Bible
- Theology: Baptist
- Polity: Congregational
- President: Max A. Miller Jr.
- Associations: Baptist World Alliance
- Headquarters: Dallas, Texas
- Territory: North America
- Origin: 1988; Dallas, Texas
- Separated from: National Baptist Convention of America
- Separations: Institutional Missionary Baptist Conference of America
- Congregations: 1,283
- Members: 400,000+ 213,275 (Note: Newer 2020 figures are not used due to controversy indicating they are subject to a major transcription error.)
- Other name: National Missionary Baptist Convention
- Official website: www.nmbca.org

The National Missionary Baptist Convention of America (NMBCA), also known as the National Missionary Baptist Convention (NMBC), is a predominantly African American Baptist Christian denomination. Headquartered in Dallas, Texas, the National Missionary Baptists—claiming continuity as the convention of R.H. Boyd—were formed in 1988. The convention is currently led by Dr. Max A. Miller Jr. as president.

== History ==
The National Missionary Baptist Convention of America was formed during a meeting attended by Dr. S. J. Gilbert, Sr. and Dr. S. M. Wright, along with several leaders and members from the National Baptist Convention of America. The meeting was held between November 14–15, 1988 at the People's Missionary Baptist Church in Dallas, Texas primarily concerning the relationship with the National Baptist Publishing Board (now known as the R.H. Boyd Publishing Corporation).

Reverend S.M. Lockridge of San Diego was elected as the first president of the newly-formed denomination, and served until his retirement in 1994. After Lockridge's retirement, elections have been held, and he was succeeded by the following presidents since 2018: Dr. S.M. Wright, Dr. W.T. Snead, Sr., Dr. Melvin V. Wade, Dr. C.C. Robertson, Dr. Nehemiah Davis, and Dr. Anthony Sharp, I.

A party led by Dr. H. J. Johnson in Dallas withdrew and formed the Institutional Missionary Baptist Conference of America from 1998–1999. This followed Johnson's unsuccessful campaign for the presidency, which was won by Dr. W.T. Snead, Sr.

From January 24–28, 2005, the National Missionary Baptists collaborated with the National Baptist Convention, USA; the National Baptist Convention of America; and the Progressive National Baptist Convention on establishing a joint agenda. From January 22–25, 2024, the NMBCA joined with the other three prominent Black Baptist denominations again as the National Baptist Joint Board Session.

== Statistics ==
As of 2024, the convention claims more than 400,000 members spread throughout the United States of America. According to the Association of Religion Data Archives in 2020, the NMBCA maintains a large presence in California, Texas, the Southeast, and portions of the Midwest.

The same Association of Religion Data Archives, in its 2010 report of US religions, stated that the NMBCA numbered 1,283 congregations and 213,275 members. In the following survey, in 2020, it reported far larger numbers: 7,564 congregations and 2,428,820 members. Christian denominations education channel Ready to Harvest disputes the 2020 numbers and suggests they are the result of a simple transcription error.

== Organization ==
As a part of the Baptist Christian tradition, the National Missionary Baptists operate congregationally, while meeting during sessions throughout the year, similar to a presbytery. The convention is governed by the National Missionary Baptist Executive Committee, which consists of: the president; vice president-at-large, and the vice presidents of boards, auxiliaries, ecumenical affairs, financial affairs, state presidents and moderators; the general secretary; corresponding secretary; treasurer; director of communications and public relations; and the president and CEO of the National Baptist Publishing Board.

The boards of the convention include the Evangelical Board; Foreign Mission Board; Educational Board; Commission Board; and Home Mission Board. Its auxiliaries include the Ministers Conference, Ministers' Wives and Widows, Senior Women, Junior Women, Nurses' Corps, Ushers', Brotherhood Union, Youth Convention, Intergenerational Women, and the Spirit of Timothy. The convention also has several departments.

== Sources ==
- Baptists Around the World, by Albert W. Wardin, Jr.
- Handbook of Denominations, 11th Edition, by Frank S. Mead, Samuel S. Hill, & Craig D. Atwood ISBN 0-687-06983-1
