= Union Baptists =

Religion

Union Baptists is a Baptist Christian denomination in United States.

== History ==
It trace their origin to the American Civil War, or war between the northern and southern United States. Baptist churches and associations, especially in border states, were rent asunder by this national conflict. Tensions over secession, war and reconstruction, as well as the fact that Primitive Baptists did not allow members to hold membership in secret societies, combined to incubate the Union Baptists. Many pro-Union Primitive Baptists joined Union Leagues, and were expelled from their churches and associations. The Mountain Union Association, formed in 1867 at Silas Creek church near Lansing, North Carolina, was the first "Union" Baptist association. The Mountain Union Association was instrumental in helping former slaves organize the New Covenant Association of Wilkes County in 1868.

This distinction, at least in name, has persisted in the Appalachias, and some churches and associations still consider themselves "Union Baptists". There seems to be no doctrinal distinction between Union Baptists and Regular Baptists. The Union Baptists mirror many traits of other Appalachian primivistic sects, such as feet washing, river baptisms, and impromptu chanted sermons. But they are also less Calvinistic and more evangelical than groups such as Primitive Baptists and Old Regular Baptists, and promote Sunday Schools and revivals. Most of the churches do not use musical instruments (though some do), and singing is strictly congregational. The old practice of lining hymns is reserved for use preceding communion and feet washing.

Three associations - Original Mountain Union, Primitive and Union - have about 3300 members in 36 churches. The geographical distribution of these churches is in 8 counties in Maryland, North Carolina, Pennsylvania, and Virginia.

There are no known surviving distinct groups of "Union" Baptists in other border states.
