= Indiana pi bill =

1897 proposed law to define squaring the circle

Goodwin's model circle as described in section 2 of the bill. It has a diameter of 10 and a stated circumference of "32" (not 31.4159~); the chord of 90° has length stated as "7" (not 7.0710~).

The Indiana pi bill was Bill 246 of the 1897 sitting of the Indiana General Assembly that was intended as a method to square the circle by implying incorrect values of the mathematical constant π (pi), the ratio of the circumference of a circle to its diameter. The bill, written by a physician-turned-amateur mathematician, never became law due to the intervention of C. A. Waldo, a professor at Purdue University, who happened to be present in the legislature on the day it went up for a vote.

The mathematical impossibility of squaring the circle using only straightedge and compass constructions, suspected since ancient times, had been proven 15 years previously, in 1882, by Ferdinand von Lindemann. Better approximations of π than those implied by the bill have been known since ancient times.

== Legislative history ==
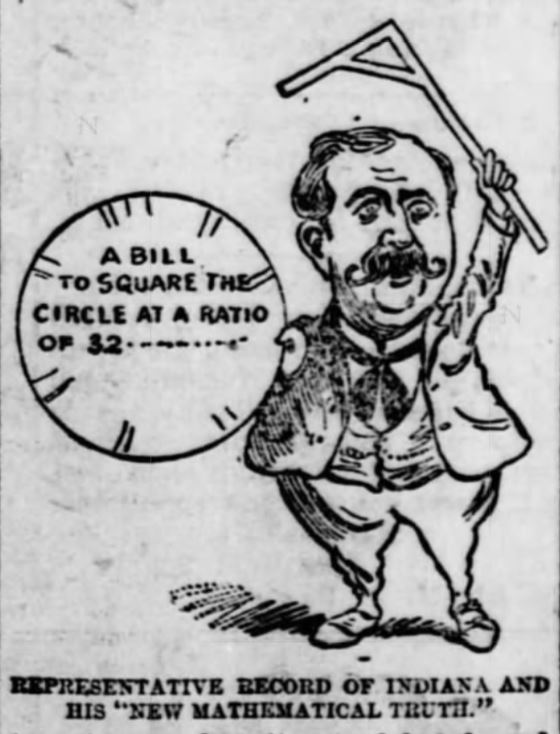
An 1897 political cartoon mocking the Indiana pi bill

In 1894, Indiana physician Edward J. Goodwin (c. 1825 – 1902), also called "Edwin Goodwin" by some sources, believed that he had discovered a way of squaring the circle. He proposed a bill to state representative Taylor I. Record, who introduced it in the House under the title "A Bill for an act introducing a new mathematical truth and offered as a contribution to education to be used only by the State of Indiana free of cost by paying any royalties whatever on the same, provided it is accepted and adopted by the official action of the Legislature of 1897".

The text of the bill consists of a series of mathematical claims, followed by a recitation of Goodwin's previous accomplishments:

... his solutions of the trisection of the angle, doubling the cube and quadrature of the circle having been already accepted as contributions to science by the American Mathematical Monthly ... And be it remembered that these noted problems had been long since given up by scientific bodies as unsolvable mysteries and above man's ability to comprehend.

Goodwin's "solutions" had been published in 1894 in the "Queries and Information" section of the American Mathematical Monthly, without peer review, under a disclaimer of "published by request of the author".

Upon its introduction in the Indiana House of Representatives, the bill's language and topic caused confusion; a member proposed that it be referred to the Finance Committee, but the Speaker accepted another member's recommendation to refer the bill to the Committee on Canals (also known as the Committee on Swamp Lands), where the bill could "find a deserved grave". It was transferred to the Committee on Education, which reported favorably. Following a motion to suspend the rules, the bill passed on February 6, 1897 without a dissenting vote.

The news of the bill caused an alarmed response from Der Tägliche Telegraph, a German-language newspaper in Indianapolis, which viewed the event with less favor than its English-speaking competitors. As this debate concluded, Purdue University professor C. A. Waldo arrived in Indianapolis to secure the annual appropriation for the Indiana Academy of Science. An assemblyman handed him the bill, offering to introduce him to the genius who wrote it. He declined, saying that he already met as many crazy people as he cared to.

When it reached the Indiana Senate, the bill was not treated as kindly, for Waldo had talked to the senators previously. The Committee on Temperance to which it had been assigned had reported it favorably, but the Senate on February 12, 1897, postponed the bill indefinitely. It had been nearly passed, but opinion changed when one senator observed that the General Assembly lacked the power to define mathematical truth. Influencing some of the senators was a report that major newspapers, such as the Chicago Tribune, were ridiculing the situation.

According to the Indianapolis News article of February 13, 1897:

... the bill was brought up and made fun of. The Senators made bad puns about it, ridiculed it and laughed over it. The fun lasted half an hour. Senator Hubbell said that it was not meet for the Senate, which was costing the State $250 a day, to waste its time in such frivolity. He said that in reading the leading newspapers of Chicago and the East, he found that the Indiana State Legislature had laid itself open to ridicule by the action already taken on the bill. He thought consideration of such a proposition was not dignified or worthy of the Senate. He moved the indefinite postponement of the bill, and the motion carried.

== Mathematics ==
=== Approximation of π ===
Although the bill has become known as the "pi bill", its text does not use the word "pi" at all. Goodwin appears to have thought of the ratio between the circumference and diameter of a circle as distinctly secondary to his main aim of squaring the circle. Towards the end of Section 2, the following passage appears:

Furthermore, it has revealed the ratio of the chord and arc of ninety degrees, which is as seven to eight, and also the ratio of the diagonal and one side of a square which is as ten to seven, disclosing the fourth important fact, that the ratio of the diameter and circumference is as five-fourths to four[.]

In other words, $\pi = \frac4{1.25} = 3.2$, and $\sqrt2=\frac{10}7 \approx 1.429$.

=== Area of the circle ===
Goodwin's main goal was not to measure lengths in the circle but to find a square with the same area as the circle. He knew that Archimedes' formula for the area of a circle, which calls for multiplying the diameter by one-fourth of the circumference, is not considered a solution to the ancient problem of squaring the circle.

This is because the problem is to construct the area using a compass and straightedge only. Archimedes did not give a method for constructing a straight line with the same length as the circumference. Goodwin was unaware of this central requirement; he believed that the problem with the Archimedean formula was that it gave wrong numerical results; a solution to the ancient problem should replace it with a "correct" formula. So, he proposed, without argument, his method:

It has been found that a circular area is to the square on a line equal to the quadrant of the circumference, as the area of an equilateral rectangle is to the square on one side.

An "equilateral rectangle" is, by definition, a square. This is an assertion that the area of a circle is the same as that of a square with the same perimeter. This claim results in mathematical contradictions to which Goodwin attempts to respond. For example, right after the above quotation:

The diameter employed as the linear unit according to the present rule in computing the circle's area is entirely wrong, as it represents the circle's area one and one-fifth times the area of a square whose perimeter is equal to the circumference of the circle.

In the model circle above, the Archimedean area (accepting Goodwin's values for the circumference and diameter) would be 80. Goodwin's proposed rule leads to an area of 64.

The area found by Goodwin's rule is $\tfrac{\pi}{4}$ times the true area of the circle, which, in many accounts of the pi bill, is interpreted as a claim that $\pi = 4$, but there is no evidence in the bill that Goodwin intended to make such a claim. He repeatedly denied that the area of the circle has anything to do with its diameter.
