= Baptist Seminary of Kentucky =

- Type: Seminary
- Established: 1996
- Affiliations: Cooperative Baptist Fellowship, National Baptist Convention of America, Inc.
- President: Dr. David Cassady
- Location: Lexington, Kentucky, United States; 38.2074°N 84.5568°W
- Language: English
- Website: bsk.edu

Baptist Seminary of Kentucky (BSK) is a theological institute located in Lexington, Kentucky, United States. It is affiliated with the Cooperative Baptist Fellowship and the National Baptist Convention of America, Inc.

The Baptist Seminary of Kentucky has its origins in a 1996 project of the Kentucky Baptist Fellowship (Cooperative Baptist Fellowship). The school began in 2002 at Calvary Baptist Church in Lexington. In 2010, it moved in Georgetown College in Georgetown, Kentucky. In 2020, it became a partner of the National Baptist Convention of America, Inc. In 2022, it moved to Central Baptist Church in Lexington, Kentucky.

Baptist Seminary of Kentucky changed their name to BSK Theological Seminary in 2024 and is accredited by the Commission on Accrediting of the Association of Theological Schools in the United States and Canada (ATS). The Master of Divinity degree program was approved by the Commission on Accrediting in 2015. And in 2024 the Master of Arts in Ministry degree program was approved by the Commission on Accrediting.
