= Fundamental Baptist Fellowship Association =

Grouping of US Baptist churches

The Baptist Fellowship Association (formerly known as Fundamental Baptist Fellowship Association or FBFA) is an association of independent fundamentalist African-American Baptist churches. It is based in Kansas City, Kansas.

The BFA was formed in 1962 when Reverends Richard C. Mattox and Robert Hunter, of Cleveland, Ohio, led conservative-fundamentalist black ministers and congregations to form the Fundamental Baptist Fellowship Association. The association meets annually and provides fundamentalist black Baptist churches a means of fellowship in the areas of evangelism and foreign missions. Each congregation is independent and autonomous.

A number of churches in the Baptist Fellowship Association hold dual affiliation with the General Association of Regular Baptist Churches. In the area of Christian education, the BFA partners with Cedarville University in Cedarville, Ohio.

Their former name, FBFA, is sometimes confused with the predominantly white Fundamental Baptist Fellowship International, whose strength is in the Southeast. The BFA is predominantly black and most of its churches are located in the Midwestern states.
