= National Baptist Evangelical Life and Soul Saving Assembly of the U.S.A. =

African-American missions body

The National Baptist Evangelical Life and Soul Saving Assembly of the United States of America (NBELSSA) is an African-American missions body first formed as an auxiliary of the National Baptist Convention of America, Inc. This body was founded in 1920 in Kansas City, Missouri by Captain Allan Arthur Banks, Sr. The NBELSSA operated within the NBC of America until 1936 or 1937, when it became an independent group. The main emphasis of the NBELSSA was in evangelism (including charity & relief work) and education (especially its Bible correspondence school). In 1952 this Assembly claimed 644 churches and was headquartered in Boise, Idaho. Many of these churches were evidently dually affiliated with other National Baptist conventions. More recently, the NBELSSA was headquartered at the Second Baptist Church of Detroit, Michigan, and was still operating a correspondence school.

== Sources ==
- Dictionary of Baptists in America, Bill J. Leonard, editor
- Directory of African American Religious Bodies, W. J. Payne, editor
- Handbook of Denominations (8th Edition), by Frank S. Mead & Samuel S. Hill
