= South Union Missionary Baptist Church =

Historic church in Palestine, Texas, US

South Union Missionary Baptist Church is an historic black church in Palestine, Texas, the oldest black church in the southern part of Palestine.

It was founded in 1890 in a small two-room house on S. Royall Street by the Rev. Dr. R. H. Boyd, then known as the "cowboy preacher" and later to become the founder of the influential National Baptist Publishing Board (now R. H. Boyd Publishing Company) in Nashville, Tennessee. The church moved to its current location at 805 S. Dorrance Street in Palestine in 1911. In 2004 a Texas historical marker was unveiled in front of its building, naming it as the oldest black church in the south part of Palestine.
