= Nashville Globe =

African-American newspaper in Tennessee

The Nashville Globe was a black-owned and operated newspaper serving the African-American community in Nashville, Tennessee. It was first published in 1906 during the boycott that followed segregation law imposed on the city's streetcars. The paper was housed in the R.H. Boyd Building in a part of town that was vibrant with African-American entrepreneurial activity.

The Nashville Globe was financed by Richard H. Boyd who was secretary of the National Baptist Publishing Board. Following R.H. Boyd's death in 1922, his son, Henry A. Boyd, took over as the paper's editor. The editors of the Globe, Henry A. Boyd and Joseph O. Battle, used the paper to encourage the support of black-owned businesses in Nashville, to speak out against racial segregation and injustice, and to advance African American education.

In the 1930s, the Globe merged with the Nashville Independent, another weekly publication, to form the Nashville Globe and Independent. The Globe was closed in 1960 after Henry A. Boyd's death.

D. A. Hart (Dock A. Hart) was the paper's manager and was featured in an autobriograohical account about his career.

== See also ==
- List of newspapers in Tennessee
