= Foundations Baptist Fellowship International =

- Abbreviation: FBFI
- Classification: Protestant
- Orientation: Baptist
- Theology: Fundamentalist
- President: Kevin Schaal
- Origin: 1967
- Separated from: Conservative Baptist Association of America
- Other name(s): Fundamental Baptist Fellowship International
- Official website: fbfi.org

The Foundations Baptist Fellowship International (FBFI), formerly the Fundamental Baptist Fellowship International, is a fellowship of Independent Fundamental Baptist individuals.

== History ==
The roots of FBFI can be traced to the Fundamental Fellowship of Northern Baptists. The Fundamental Fellowship was organized in 1920 as the National Federation of Fundamentalists of the Northern Baptists, during the Fundamentalist–Modernist Controversy in the Northern Baptist Convention (NBC). While more militant fundamentalists withdrew from the NBC in 1932 to form the General Association of Regular Baptist Churches, members of the Fellowship labored within the Convention and sought reform.

This continued into the 1940s, when fundamentalists organized the Conservative Baptist Foreign Mission Society in 1943 in protest of liberal policies of NBC's foreign mission society. In 1946 the Fundamentalist Fellowship changed its name to Conservative Baptist Fellowship and was instrumental in organizing the Conservative Baptist Association of America in 1947 and the Conservative Baptist Home Mission Society in 1948. Conflict caused the Fellowship to organize the World Conservative Baptist Mission (now Baptist World Mission), which would only appoint missionaries who were premillennial in eschatology.

In 1967, the Conservative Baptist Fellowship broke all ties with the Conservative Baptist Association movement and took the name Fundamental Baptist Fellowship of America. Some of its members formed the New Testament Association of Independent Baptist Churches. Relations were strained, but these two groups reconciled in 1974, though they remain separate organizations.

== Organization ==
The FBFI is a fellowship of individuals who agree with the Statement of Faith and purposes of the Fellowship. The chief purposes of the Fellowship are to strengthen and promote historic fundamentalism, to defend the faith while exposing and opposing religious compromise, to promote religious liberty and to lead in evangelism and church growth.

The FBFI has three main points of emphasis: national and regional meetings, a magazine, and the chaplaincy. Frontline magazine, the journal of the Fellowship, is published six times per year. The FBFI is accredited by the Department of Defense to endorse military and law enforcement chaplains. Each region and the national organization hold annual meetings for preaching and fellowship.

Offices are in Taylors, South Carolina. The FBFI is organized into 13 regional fellowships - Alaska Region, Northern California, Southern California, Mid-America, Mid-Atlantic, South, North Central, Northeast, Northwest, Southwest, South Central, Caribbean, and International. In 1995 individual members of the FBFI were related to 402 different independent Baptist churches. 142 of these 402 churches were also aligned with other fundamentalist groups.

Maranatha Baptist University, Bob Jones University, and several other colleges are closely related to the FBFI.

The FBFI is sometimes confused with the Fundamental Baptist Fellowship Association (FBFA) which is based in Kansas.
