= R. H. Boyd =

American minister and businessman (1843–1922)

Richard Henry Boyd
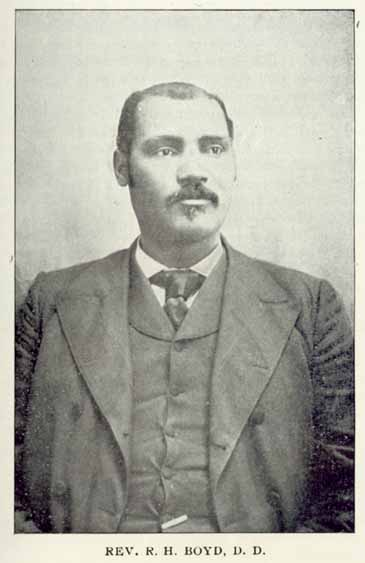
- Boyd c.1901
- Born: March 15, 1843; Noxubee County, Mississippi, U.S.
- Died: August 22, 1922 (aged 79); Nashville, Tennessee, U.S.
- Other name: Dick Gray

Richard Henry Boyd (March 15, 1843 – August 22, 1922) was an African-American minister and businessman who was the founder and head of the National Baptist Publishing Board and a founder of the National Baptist Convention of America, Inc.

== Early life ==
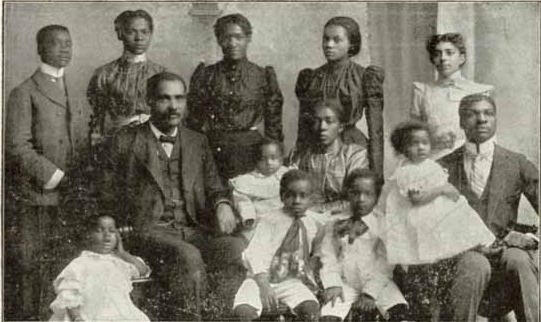
Boyd and family

Boyd was born into slavery at the B. A. Gray plantation in Noxubee County, Mississippi, on March 15, 1843. He was one of ten children of his mother, Indiana Dixon. He was originally named Dick Gray, having been given the surname of his slave master. As a child, he moved twice with his master's household, to Lowndes County, Mississippi, in 1848, and to Claiborne Parish, Louisiana, in 1853.

In 1859, he was sold to Benoni W. Gray, who took him to a cotton plantation near Brenham in Washington County, Texas. During the American Civil War, he served Gray as a bodyservant in the Confederate Army. After Gray and his two eldest sons were killed and a third son was badly wounded in fighting near Chattanooga, Tennessee, Boyd returned to Texas with the surviving son. In Texas, he took over management of the Gray plantation, successfully producing and selling cotton. Following emancipation, he also worked as a cowboy and in a sawmill. In 1867, he changed his name to Richard Henry Boyd; Richard ("Dick") had been his grandfather's first name, but there is no record of the reasons for his choice of his new middle name and surname.

After emancipation, Boyd, who did not learn the alphabet until the age of 22, began a process of self-education. He used Webster's Blue-Backed Speller and McGuffey's First Reader as texts and hired a white girl to teach him. In about 1869 or 1870, he enrolled in Bishop College in Marshall, Texas, an American Baptist Home Mission Society school for the education of freed slaves. He attended Bishop for two years, but did not graduate. Later in life, he received honorary doctoral degrees from Guadalupe College and Alabama Agricultural and Mechanical State College.

In 1868, Boyd married Laura Thomas, who died less than a year later. In 1871, he married Harriett Albertine Moore.

== Religious career ==
In 1869, Boyd was baptized in Hopewell Baptist Church in Navasota, Texas. Shortly thereafter, he felt called to the ministry and was ordained as a minister in 1871. Subsequently, he served as a pastor to several Texas churches, including the Nineveh Baptist Church in Grimes County, the Union Baptist Church in Palestine, and the Mount Zion Baptist Church in San Antonio, and helped to organize other churches in Palestine (including South Union Missionary Baptist Church), Waverly, Old Danville, Navasota, and Crockett. In 1870, he helped organize the first black Baptist association in Texas, the Texas Negro Baptist Convention, and served as its missionary and educational secretary from 1870 to 1874. In 1876, he represented black Texas Baptists at the Centennial Exposition in Philadelphia.

While in Texas, Boyd became concerned that the Sunday school materials and other publications of the Southern Baptist Convention and American Baptist Publication Society, which were produced by white people, did not meet the needs of African-American Baptists. He became interested in publishing black-authored materials for use in churches and Sunday schools. Because this view was not shared by all members of the Texas Negro Baptist Convention, in 1893 Boyd left that association to form the General Missionary Baptist Convention of Texas. In 1894 and 1895, he produced his first pamphlets for use in black Baptist Sunday schools. At the 1895 annual meeting of National Baptist Convention in St. Louis, Missouri, he pressed for the creation of a publishing board for the black Baptists and received the support of Elias C. Morris, president of the National Baptist Convention. In 1896, he resigned from his church positions in Texas and moved to Nashville to establish the National Baptist Publishing Board, arriving there on November 7, 1896.

=== National Baptist Publishing Board ===
Boyd did not have National Baptist Convention financial support to start the Publishing Board, so he financed its establishment himself, using real estate in Texas that he owned as collateral, and received assistance with printing from the white Southern Baptist Convention, which had its main publishing operations in Nashville.

The National Baptist Publishing Board fulfilled Boyd's goal of providing black Baptists with religious materials written by other black Baptists, primarily periodicals and Sunday School materials, but also including some books. At the beginning, the Publishing Board took over responsibility for publishing the National Baptist Magazine and it launched the new Teacher's Monthly in 1897. The Publishing Board started making a profit as early as the first quarter of 1897, when it distributed more than 180,000 copies of published materials, and it grew increasingly profitable over time.

In 1898, in collaboration with nine other men, Boyd incorporated the National Baptist Publishing Board under a Tennessee state charter. Under the charter, the Publishing Board was owned by Boyd and governed by a self-perpetuating board of trustees.

The National Baptist Publishing Board became the principal source of religious publications for black Baptists worldwide. By 1906, it was the largest African American publishing company in the United States. The business employed as many as 110 workers. In its first 18 years, it issued more than 128 million periodicals. It is credited with being the first publisher of the old songs of Negro slaves, and it produced more than 25 songbooks and hymnals by 1921, including Golden Gems: A Song Book for the Church Choir, the Pew, and Sunday School (1901) and The National Baptist Hymnal (1903). The board's publications are considered to have played a key role in establishing an African American Baptist religious and racial identity in the United States.

=== Splitting of the National Baptist Convention ===
In 1915, the success of the Publishing Board under Boyd's leadership led to a split within the National Baptist Convention. Pastors and other leaders within the convention were suspicious of the Publishing Board and sought greater control, while Boyd asserted that the Publishing Board was independent. Boyd, who served as the National Baptist Convention secretary of missions from 1896 to 1914 while also leading the Publishing Board, claimed that the Publishing Board regularly contributed some of its profits to the missionary work of the National Baptist Convention, but this was disputed.

Following confrontations at the annual meeting of the National Baptist Convention in Chicago in 1915, Boyd and his supporters formed the National Baptist Convention of America, which became known informally as "National Baptist Convention, Unincorporated," and was sometimes derisively called the "Boyd National Convention." The leaders remaining in the original convention incorporated in 1916, adopting the name National Baptist Convention, USA, Inc. The National Baptist Convention, USA, Inc. sued unsuccessfully to obtain ownership of the Publishing Board and subsequently created its own Sunday School publishing board.

== Other business activities ==
Boyd's business interests extended beyond the Publishing Board. The National Baptist Church Supply Company, which he established in 1902, sold a diverse range of supplies for churches, including pews, fans, pulpits, and pipe organs.

Another of his business activities was design and sale of African-American dolls. His National Negro Doll Company is believed to have pioneered the marketing of black dolls for black children for the purpose of black pride. Boyd started selling black dolls imported from Europe in 1908, after experiencing difficulty finding suitable dolls for the children in his family. In 1911, his National Negro Doll Company began to manufacture dolls. He was quoted as contrasting his dolls with Negro dolls then produced by white-owned businesses, saying: "These dolls are not made of that disgraceful and humiliating type that we have grown accustomed to seeing Negro dolls made of. They represent the intelligent and refined Negro of the day, rather than the type of toy that is usually given to children and, as a rule, used as a scarecrow." The doll company was not profitable, and the company ceased operations around 1915.

In Nashville, he was one of the founders and first president of the One-Cent Savings and Trust Company Bank, a bank expressly intended to serve the financial needs of African American depositors who believed that white-owned banks looked down on their small deposits. Although the minimum deposit was actually 10 cents, the name "One-Cent" was chosen to emphasize that every customer was important, no matter how little money they had. The bank, which opened its doors in 1904 and reported assets of $80,000 as of 1912, was still in business as of 2009 as the Citizens Savings Bank and Trust Company.

== Civil rights activities ==
Boyd was a public advocate for African-American civil rights. As early as the 1890s he voiced his concern that whites planned to reverse the civil rights gains that African Americans had made in the years after the Civil War, and in subsequent years he worked against the Jim Crow laws enacted to enforce segregation.

=== Nashville streetcar boycott ===
After the Tennessee General Assembly enacted a 1905 law to segregate Nashville's streetcar system, local black leaders were determined to protest the law through a boycott of the public transportation system. When the law first went into effect in July, the boycott was effective, as few blacks were riding streetcars. Boyd, then head of the local chapter of the National Negro Business League, joined with other prominent citizens to promote and formalize the boycott. Because many blacks needed the streetcar system to travel to and from work, it proved difficult to maintain participation in the boycott. To help their fellow black citizens avoid using Nashville's public streetcars, Boyd joined with lawyer James C. Napier and funeral home director Preston Taylor to establish a rival black-owned public transit system, the Union Transportation Company. The new company began service on September 29, 1905, operating five steam buses. These vehicles lacked the power needed to climb some of the city's hills, so the company acquired a fleet of 14 electric buses. To avoid buying electricity from a white-owned utility, the transportation company powered the buses with a generator in the basement of the Publishing Board building. The company had limited financial resources, was not able to effectively meet the transportation needs of Nashville's geographically dispersed black population, and was handicapped by a tax on electric streetcars that the city of Nashville enacted in 1906 specifically to combat the black-owned business. The Union Transportation Company went out of business within a year, by which time the boycott had been largely abandoned. Although the boycott was ultimately unsuccessful, its long duration was one source of inspiration for bus boycotts in the 1950s.

== Writings ==
Boyd wrote 14 books and numerous pamphlets. His books included:

- Baptist Catechism and Doctrine (1899)
- National Baptist Pastor's Guide (1900)
- National Jubilee Melody Songbook (no date)
- Plantation Melody Songs
- The Separate or "Jim Crow" Car Laws (1909)
- Theological Kernals
- An Outline of Negro Baptist History
- The Story of the Publishing Board

== Death and legacy ==
Boyd died in Nashville of a cerebral hemorrhage on August 22, 1922. His funeral was held in Ryman Auditorium and was attended by several thousand people. He is buried in Greenwood Cemetery in Nashville.

R. H. and Harriett Boyd were the parents of nine children, of whom six survived to adulthood. A son, Henry Allen Boyd, was a leader in the Nashville African-American community and a cofounder of the Nashville Globe newspaper, and succeeded his father as head of the National Baptist Publishing Board.

The National Baptist Publishing Board was renamed the R. H. Boyd Publishing Corporation in his honor in 2000. The corporation and the R. H. Boyd Family Endowment Fund offer fellowships in his name for African-Americans engaged in graduate study.

In April 2009, he was posthumously inducted into the Music City Walk of Fame in Nashville in honor of his contributions to preserving the music of former slaves and their descendants.
