= Taylor I. Record =

American politician

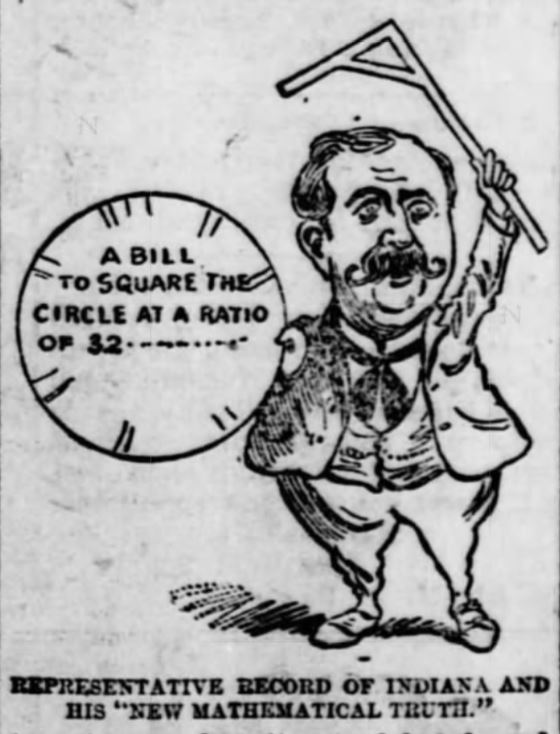
- An 1897 political cartoon mocking Record's bill

Member of the Indiana House of Representatives for Posey County
- In office November 4, 1896 – November 9, 1898

Personal details
- Born: October 12, 1846 St. Joseph County, Indiana
- Died: November 20, 1912 (aged 66) Posey County, Indiana
- Party: Democratic

Taylor I. Record (also spelled Irven Records, 1846–1912) was an American politician who served as a member of the Indiana House of Representatives representing Posey County. He is best known for his introduction of the Indiana pi bill, which attempted to define Pi as 3.2, through "squaring the circle". A constituent and amateur mathematician, Edward J. Goodwin, approached Record to put his idea into law, so it could be incorporated into education. When a visiting professor heard of the bill, it stalled in the Senate and was not passed. Record, a part time farmer, admitted he did not understand what the bill meant "as I have had only a common school education," but submitted it anyway under the urgings of Goodwin. Record also served as a member of the Posey county council.

== Biography ==
Taylor I. Record was born on October 12, 1846, to Alfred Records (1820–1889) and Rebecca Jane Gibson (1822–1853), the fourth of six children. He moved to Posey county from St. Joseph County at the age of 9, where he spent the rest of his life. He married Sarah "Sally" Ann Cox (1849–1882) on August 4, 1867, and had four children with her: Clara E., Thomas Edgar, Emma Ethel, and Ella Viola. After Sally's 1882 death, Record married Mary Ann Yeager (1850–1896) on April 5, 1883, and had a son, Lester Edmund with her. After Mary's death, Record married Medaline Bigelow on October 25, 1898. Record died after a year of disease on November 20, 1912. He was a Regular Baptist.
