= Clarence Abiathar Waldo =

American mathematician (1852–1926)

Clarence A. Waldo
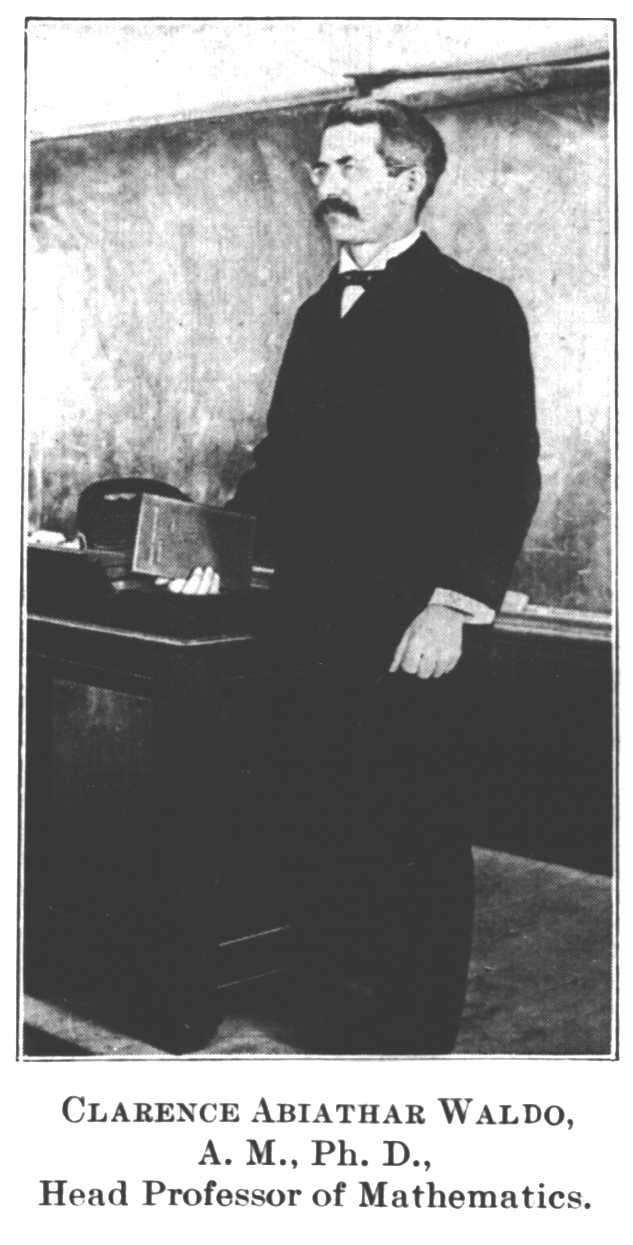
- C. A. Waldo
- Born: January 21, 1852; Hammond, New York, U.S.
- Died: October 1, 1926 (aged 74)
- Education: Wesleyan University (AB, MA); Syracuse University (PhD)
- Known for: Advocating against the Indiana Pi Bill
- Scientific career
- Fields: Mathematics
- Workplaces: Purdue University; Washington University in St. Louis

Clarence Abiathar Waldo (January 21, 1852 – October 1, 1926) was an American mathematician, author and educator. He is most known for the role he played in the Indiana Pi Bill affair.

== Life and career ==
Born in Hammond, New York, Waldo married Abby Wright Allen (1856–1935) in Stamford, Connecticut in 1881. In 1884 they had a daughter.

Waldo received his A.B. (1875) and A.M. (1878) degrees from Wesleyan University and his Ph.D. (1894) from Syracuse University.

A member of Sigma Xi and Phi Beta Kappa, he was tutor at the Department of Mathematics of Wesleyan University from 1877 to 1881. Subsequently, he was professor of mathematics (from 1883 to 1891), librarian, and twice Acting President (from 1885 to 1886 and 1888 to 1889) at Rose Polytechnic Institute; professor of mathematics at DePauw University from 1891 to 1895; head professor of mathematics at Purdue University from 1895 to 1898; professor of mathematics (1908 to 1910), Thayer Professor of Mathematics and Applied Mechanics, head of the Department of Mathematics (1910 to 1917), and professor emeritus (after 1917) at Washington University in St. Louis.

In 1888 Waldo published A manual of descriptive geometry, with numerous problems.

Waldo was a charter member of the Indiana Academy of Science and served as the academy's president in 1897. He achieved a modicum of fame that year when he explained to members of the Indiana State Senate why a bill that would redefine the value of pi and attempt to square the circle should not be adopted.

== Book ==
- Clarence A. Waldo, A manual of descriptive geometry, with numerous problems, Boston: D.C. Heath and Co., 1888, 1895, 77 pages.
