= Venture Church Network =

Christian association of churches in the United States

- Classification: Protestant
- Orientation: Baptist
- Theology: Evangelical
- President: David Whitaker
- Region: United States
- Origin: 1947
- Separated from: Northern Baptist Convention
- Other name: Conservative Baptist Association of America (1947–2021)

Venture Church Network (formerly known as the Conservative Baptist Association of America) is a Baptist Christian association in the United States with each local congregation being autonomous and responsible for their own way of functioning.

== History ==
The first organization of Conservative Baptists was the Conservative Baptist Foreign Mission Society (CBFMS), now called WorldVenture, formed in Chicago, in 1943. What became the Venture Church Network was organized in Atlantic City, New Jersey, in 1947 as the Conservative Baptist Association of America. The Conservative Baptist Association emerged as part of the continuing Fundamentalist–Modernist Controversy within the Northern Baptist Convention. The forming churches were fundamentalist/conservative churches that had remained in cooperation with the Northern Baptist Convention after other churches had left, such as those that formed the General Association of Regular Baptist Churches. At the 1946 NBC meeting, the old convention made it clear that it would not allow a competing missionary agency to operate within it. Churches withdrew, forming the new association, and hundreds of others withdrew in the following years. The conservatives were in the majority in Minnesota and Arizona, and the Northern Baptists lost those state agencies. The New Testament Association of Independent Churches and the Conservative Baptist Fellowship, which renamed itself the Fundamental Baptist Fellowship and is now the Fundamental Baptist Fellowship International, split from the Conservative Baptists in the 1960s. On February 16, 2021 the association announced it was changing its name to Venture Church Network because the name Conservative Baptist “no longer connects with what it was originally intended to communicate”.

== Constituents ==
The movement presently supports three national agencies - Venture Church Network, WorldVenture (formerly CBFMS, then CBInternational), and Missions Door (formerly Conservative Baptist Home Mission Society, then Mission To The Americas). These agencies have omitted the word "Baptist" from their names, and it is notable that the four associated educational institutions listed below, likewise have omitted "Baptist" from their names also.

Conservative Baptists cooperate with affiliated institutions of higher learning as well as youth and women's ministries. Each local Conservative Baptist church is an autonomous organization in voluntary affiliation with each other through regional associations.

== Reorganization ==
Until a structural reorganization began in early 2004, Venture Church Network was a network of churches and ministries, committed to evangelization and church planting. In 2003, its membership comprised over 1,200 churches representing over 200,000 church members.

Following the dissolution of an Organization Task Force after an unsuccessful attempt to unite the national agencies in a single structure and vision, Venture Church Network was reorganized as “a covenantal fellowship of Regional Associations of Conservative Baptist churches, which have joined together to make the most of the God-given strengths of each member Region for a common purpose.” In 2005 new bylaws were adopted whereby regional associations of local churches are the only members of Venture Church Network; the local churches themselves are members of the regional associations and no longer have any direct participation in the national organization. The regional directors and their boards, as representatives of their member churches, are organizationally and relationally bound through the Covenant of the Regions. The regional directors comprise the Venture Church Network Board, representing the interests of the regions and the member churches of the regions. Venture Church Network is led by a leadership team consisting of the eight regional directors, director of chaplaincy and president (Board Chairman). As of 2021, the staff of Venture Church Network listed on its website were limited to the President, a Director of Chaplaincy, an associate director of Chaplaincy, and an Executive Assistant.

== International ties ==
Venture Church Network maintains fellowship and relationship with World Venture, Missions Door and networks of churches in other countries of the world through CBGlobal, which has a board consisting of national organization leaders but no staff of its own.

== Gender and LGBTQ issues ==
Pastors and staff associated with Venture Church Network are required to affirm their statement of beliefs, which include defining marriage as "one man and one woman" and asserting that "gender is determined by our biological sex". Both LGBTQ people and cisgender heterosexuals who support LGBTQ rights are therefore prohibited from participating in the organization.

Although the VCN website does not state whether they permit women in leadership positions, as of 2026, eleven out of twelve staff members are men, and the sole woman is an executive assistant.

== Associated educational institutions ==
- Western Seminary, Portland, Oregon; San Jose, California; Sacramento, California
- Denver Seminary, Denver, Colorado
- Arizona Christian University, Glendale, Arizona
- New England Bible College, South Portland, Maine
