= National Baptist Convention of America International =

American Christian denomination (1915-)

- Emblem
- Abbreviation: NBCA
- Classification: Protestant
- Orientation: Baptist
- Polity: Congregationalist
- President: Dr. Samuel C. Tolbert Jr.
- General Secretary: Rev. Shelton C. Dixon
- Chief Operating Officer: Langston E. Gaither
- Associations: World Council of Churches; Baptist World Alliance
- Region: mainly the United States and Canada but has a presence in Africa
- Founder: Rev. R. H. Boyd
- Origin: 1915
- Separated from: National Baptist Convention
- Separations: National Missionary Baptist Convention of America (separated 1988)
- Members: 225,776
- Other names: National Baptist Convention of America (very common), Boyd Convention, National Baptist Convention

The National Baptist Convention of America International, (NBCA Intl or NBCA) more commonly known as the National Baptist Convention of America or sometimes the Boyd Convention, is a Christian denomination based in the United States. It is a predominantly African American Baptist denomination, and is headquartered in Louisville, Kentucky. The National Baptist Convention of America has members in the United States, Canada, the Caribbean, and Africa. The current president of the National Baptist Convention of America is Dr. Samuel C. Tolbert Jr. of Lake Charles, Louisiana.

== Name ==
The first name of the denomination was the National Baptist Convention of America; it was later incorporated as the National Baptist Convention of America, Inc. It was sometimes known as the Boyd National Convention. The current name of the convention is the National Baptist Convention of America International, which is incorporated as the National Baptist Convention of America International, Inc.

== History ==
In 1915, leaders and pastors of the National Baptist Convention, USA disputed the ownership and operation of the independently-owned National Baptist Publishing Board in Nashville, Tennessee. The National Baptist Publishing Board was founded and led by Rev. R. H. Boyd out of concern with publishing companies established and led by white Baptists. He did not have financial support from the NBC USA and financed it himself using real estate in Texas and assistance from the Southern Baptist Convention.

The National Baptist Publishing Board fulfilled Boyd's goal of providing black Baptists with religious materials written by other black Baptists, primarily periodicals and Sunday School materials, but also including some books. At its beginning, the National Baptist Publishing Board took over responsibility for publishing the National Baptist Magazine and it launched the new Teacher's Monthly in 1897. The company started making a profit as early as the first quarter of 1897, when it distributed more than 180,000 copies of published materials. The National Baptist Publishing Board became the principal source of religious publications for black Baptists worldwide.

By 1906, it grew to become the largest African American publishing company in the United States. It is credited with being the first publisher of the old songs of Negro slaves, and it produced more than 25 songbooks and hymnals by 1921, including Golden Gems: A Song Book for the Church Choir, the Pew, and Sunday School (1901) and The National Baptist Hymnal (1903). Its publications are considered to have played a key role in establishing an African American Baptist religious and racial identity in the United States.

The dispute between Boyd and the NBC USA began due to the National Baptist Publishing Board's success. Pastors and other leaders within the convention were suspicious of the company and sought greater control, while Boyd asserted that the National Baptist Publishing Board was independent. The publishing company was incorporated as an independent entity in 1898. Boyd, who served as the National Baptist Convention secretary of missions from 1896 to 1914 while also leading the National Baptist Publishing Board, claimed that the company regularly contributed some of its profits to the missionary work of the NBC USA, but this was disputed.

Following confrontations at the annual meeting of the National Baptist Convention in Chicago in 1915, Boyd and his supporters formed the National Baptist Convention of America, which became known informally as "National Baptist Convention, Unincorporated," and was sometimes derisively called the "Boyd National Convention". The leaders remaining in the original convention incorporated in 1916, adopting the name "National Baptist Convention, USA, Inc." The National Baptist Convention, USA, sued unsuccessfully to obtain ownership of the National Baptist Publishing Board and subsequently created its own Sunday School publishing board. In 1988, another controversy surrounding the publishing board's independence (now the R.H. Boyd Publishing Corporation) led to the formation of the National Missionary Baptist Convention of America; and the NBCA established its own publishing board.

From 1986 to 2003, the convention was led Rev. E. Edward Jones, a civil rights icon who was the pastor for fifty-seven years of the Galilee Baptist Church in Shreveport, Louisiana.

In the early 2000s, the NBCA participated in the Joint National Baptist Convention, which it joined again for the 2024 session.

The NBCA's headquarters were formerly located in Dallas, Texas. In 2017 the convention moved its headquarters to Louisville, Kentucky on the campus of Simmons College of Kentucky during the tenure of Dr. Samuel C. Tolbert Jr. By 2018 under his leadership, the convention affiliated with the Baptist Seminary of Kentucky (primarily affiliated with the theologically moderate to progressive Cooperative Baptist Fellowship). It also hosted a conference with the theologically liberal Progressive National Baptist Convention in 2018 alongside the Cooperative Baptists.

== Statistics ==
In 1944, the convention had 2,352,339 members, and in 2000, the National Baptist Convention of America grew to about 3.5 million members in the United States. It became the third-largest predominantly African American Christian body in the United States after the National Baptist Convention, USA and the Church of God in Christ. In 2022, its self-reported membership stagnated with an estimated 3.5 million members in approximately 4,000 churches according to a separate study by the Baptist World Alliance.

A prior 2020 study from the Association of Religion Data Archives numbered 225,776 members in 389 active churches in the United States. In 2010, it had 304,414 members in 575 churches. According to the World Council of Churches, it had a global membership of 5,000,000 members. As of 2024, the NBCA continues to estimate 3.5 million global members, as also estimated since 2018. Its claimed, self-reported membership has been contested.

Some members of this convention have dual affiliation with other Baptist denominations, and the National Baptist Convention of America promotes partnership with the Cooperative Baptists "to engage in multi- racial experiences of worship, fellowship, disaster relief, educational advancement and healthy dialogue that brings about oneness in the body of Christ. Local member NBCA and CBF churches develop stronger ties for the work they embark upon together to the Glory of God."

== Doctrine ==
The National Baptist Convention of America's members denounce same-sex marriage and same-sex unions, and as the NBC USA, they consider homosexuality an illegitimate expression of God's will. The National Baptist Convention of America also doctrinally rejects the ordination of women, though some congregations throughout the United States and Canada have attempted to ordain women as deacons, ministers, and pastors.

Its ecumenical partners (the Cooperative Baptist Fellowship and Chicago Theological Seminary of the United Church of Christ) permit women's ordination, and some of them affirm same-sex marriage as well as gender transition. In response to the theological differences between the Cooperative and National Baptists, NBCA president Dr. Tolbert in 2020 stated, "We get more done realizing we don't have to agree on everything."

== See also ==
- Christianity in the United States
