= Christian Unity Baptist Association =

The Christian Unity Baptist Association was organized September 27–28, 1935, at Zion Hill Church in Ashe County, North Carolina, by six Baptist congregations. Some of these churches were remnants of the Macedonia Baptist Association, which existed for a short time in the first quarter of the 20th century. These churches had a mixed Missionary Baptist and Primitive Baptist background. Leaders in this new organization included Frank Sturgill, F. Carl Sturgill, and Nancy Owens.

Though the Christian Unity Association shared much in common with fellow mountain Baptists, they differed from the majority of them in three important points: (1) falling from grace; (2) open communion; and (3) women preachers. Two women preached at the organizational meeting.

The Christian Unity Baptist Association is defunct. This body divided in 1969, and the majority chose to affiliate with the General Association of Separate Baptists. The minority represented continuity with the original constitution and articles of faith. The two surviving churches from that fellowship (Zion Hill & Hooks Branch in Va.), with a combined membership of about 50, no longer hold an associational structure.
