= General Conference of the Evangelical Baptist Church =

Organization

The General Conference of the Evangelical Baptist Church, Inc. was organized in 1935 as the Church of the Full Gospel, Inc, by members of several Free Will Baptist churches, under the leadership of William Howard Carter. The organization currently is headquartered in Tucson, Arizona.
