= Cooperative Baptist Fellowship =

Baptist Christian denomination in the United States

- Classification: Protestant
- Orientation: Baptist
- Theology: Mainline
- Polity: Congregationalist
- Exec. co-ordinator: Paul Baxley
- Associations: Baptist World Alliance
- Region: United States
- Headquarters: Decatur, Georgia
- Origin: 1991; Atlanta
- Separated from: Southern Baptist Convention (in 2002)
- Congregations: 1,800
- Members: 750,000
- Missionary organization: Global Missions
- Aid organization: Disaster Response
- Seminaries: Baptist Seminary of Kentucky
- Official website: cbf.net

The Cooperative Baptist Fellowship (CBF) is a Baptist Christian denomination in United States, established after the conservative resurgence within the Southern Baptist Convention. It is affiliated with the Baptist World Alliance, and headquartered in Decatur, Georgia. According to a census published in 2023, the CBF claimed 1,800 churches and 750,000 members.

== History ==
The Cooperative Baptist Fellowship has its origins in a meeting in Atlanta in 1990 of a group of theologically moderate churches within the Southern Baptist Convention disagreeing about the control of the direction of the convention by fundamentalists, as well as the opposition to the ordination of women. The denomination was officially founded in 1991.

By 1996, the fellowship had 1,400 churches and was still affiliated with the Southern Baptist Convention. In 1998, it began ordaining chaplains.

In 2002, it officially left the Southern Baptist Convention and became a member of the Baptist World Alliance.

Since the first quarter of the 21st century, the Cooperative Baptist Fellowship officially partnered with the National Baptist Convention of America, similar to the American Baptist Churches USA and Progressive National Baptists fellowship agreement of 1970.

== Organization ==
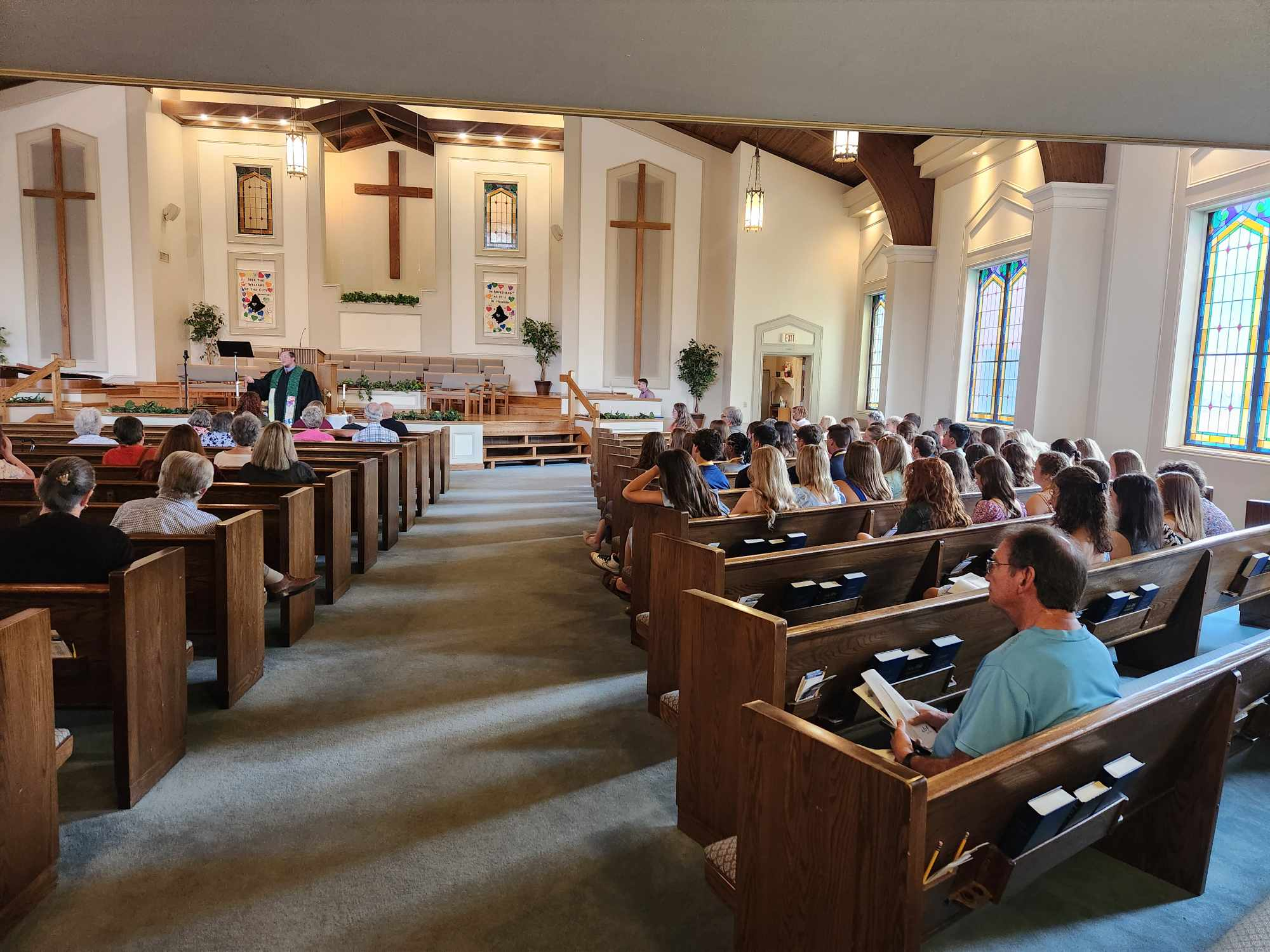
Worship service at First Baptist Church of Morehead, Kentucky.

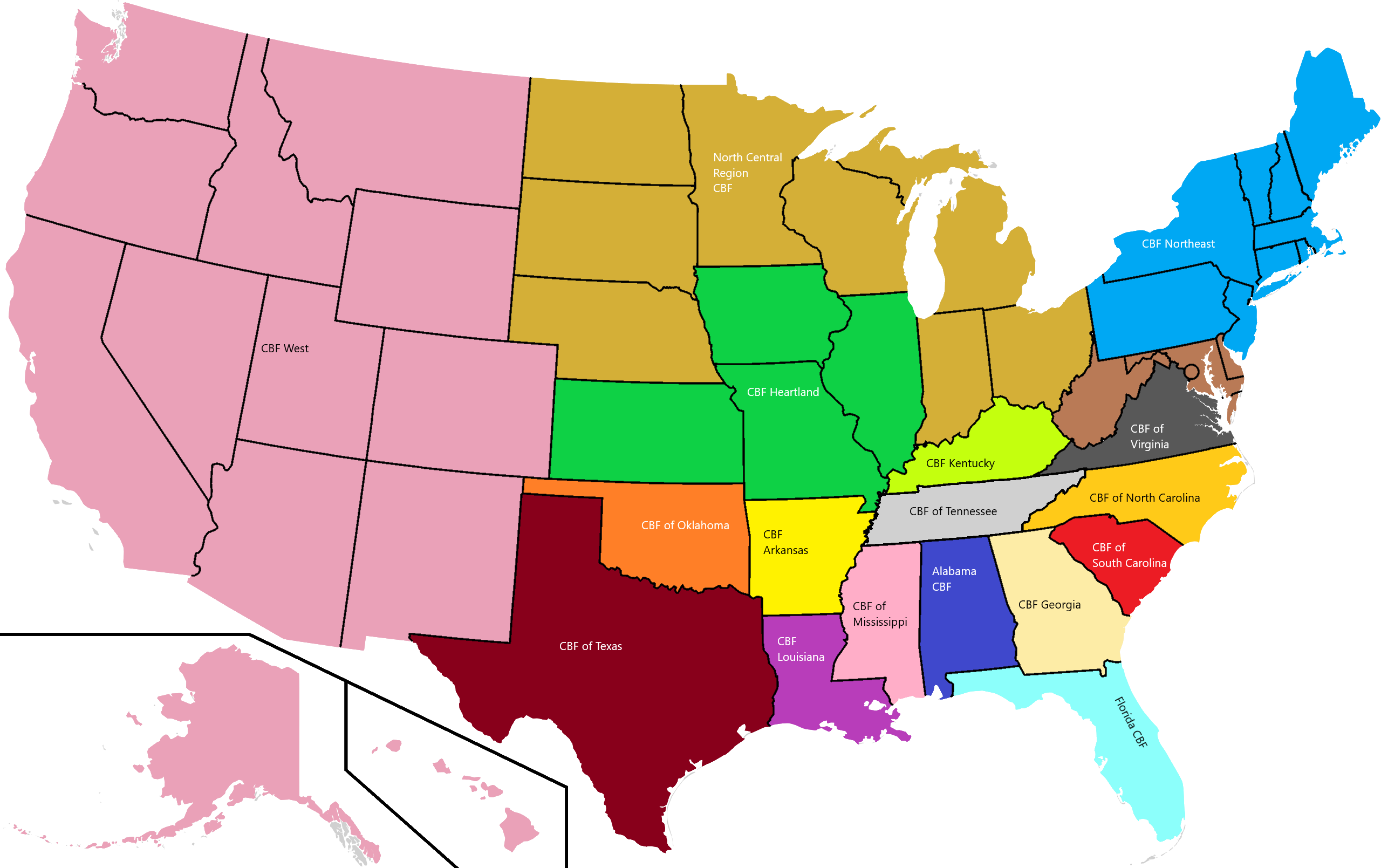
Map of 18/19 of the regional and state organizations affiliated with the Cooperative Baptist Fellowship

There are CBF-affiliated churches in 43 out of the 50 states. Alongside the national CBF, there are 19 state and regional organizations that are affiliated with CBF and help provide churches with local resources. The CBF has a missionary organization, Global Missions.

For theological education, instead of owning and controlling specific seminaries, CBF partners with preexisting institutions by providing scholarships and academic support. CBF affiliates with several theological institutes throughout the country, many of which are connected to larger universities or sponsored by different denominations. Among its theological education partners are Baptist University of the Americas, Baptist Seminary of Kentucky, Boston University School of Theology, Brite Divinity School, Candler School of Theology at Emory University, Duke University Divinity School, Fuller Theological Seminary, Gardner-Webb School of Divinity, Harvard Divinity School, International Baptist Theological Study Centre Amsterdam, McAfee School of Theology, Truett Seminary at Baylor University, Vanderbilt Divinity School, Virginia Theological Seminary, Union Presbyterian Seminary, Wake Forest University School of Divinity, and Wesley Theological Seminary.

== Beliefs ==
The Cooperative Baptist Fellowship, like the Southern Baptist Convention from which it split, does not enforce particular beliefs upon congregations, as is congruent with traditional Baptist theology; however, the denomination has a Baptist confession of faith. The CBF's "understanding of Baptist faith and practice is expressed by [their] emphasis on freedom in biblical interpretation and congregational governance, the participation of women and men in all aspects of church leadership and Christian ministry, and religious liberty for all people."

The CBF also ascribes to the "Four Fragile Freedoms" as developed in The Baptist Identity: Four Fragile Freedoms by Walter Shurden. CBF leadership interprets these freedoms as: soul freedom, Bible freedom, church freedom, and religious freedom.

Affirmation of women in ministry was one of the founding principles of the Cooperative Baptist Fellowship. Most CBF members agree that both men and women may be ordained as ministers or deacons and serve as pastors of churches.

On social issues, the CBF does not issue position statements. CBF members agree that as it is a fellowship of autonomous churches, issuing statements would be beyond its purpose. However, CBF policies are not binding on individual congregations which make their own decisions regarding any issue; neither can a congregation be excluded from the CBF for disagreeing with core values or policies.

=== Marriage ===
In October 2000, the Coordinating Council voted to adopt a statement of values prohibiting financial support for gay-affirming organizations and the hiring of non-celibate gays as CBF staff or missionaries.

In June 2016, the CBF co-sponsored a conference on sexuality and initiated the "'Illumination Project' approved by the Governing Board (formerly the Coordinating Council) to develop models for the Fellowship community to air differences not only about the hiring ban but also other hot-button issues dividing churches, denominations and society".

In February 2018, the association removed a statement from its hiring policy prohibiting the hiring of LGBT staff members or sending LGBT missionaries, mentioning that leadership positions were reserved for those living in faithful celibacy or in marriage between a woman and a man.

In June 2018, the Affirming Network for full LGBTQ inclusion and affirmation was founded.

In November 2018, due to these decisions, the Kentucky Baptist Convention (Southern Baptist Convention) proceeded with the disaffiliation of churches having a dual affiliation with the Cooperative Baptist Fellowship.

In 2024, the Affirming Network for full LGBTQ inclusion and affirmation merged with the Association of Welcoming and Affirming Baptists.
