= Institutional Missionary Baptist Conference of America =

The Institutional Missionary Baptist Conference of America is a recent division of the National Missionary Baptist Convention of America, which was formed on November 15, 1988.

When the NMBCA was formed, Dr. S. M. Lockridge of San Diego, California was elected president of the convention and served until his retirement in 1994. After his retirement a series of events and contested elections eventually brought about the formation of the Institutional Missionary Baptist Conference of America around 1999. Dr. H.J. Johnson, of Dallas, Texas, General Secretary of the convention, ran for the presidency in 1995 and again in 1998. Following the second election defeat, Dr. Johnson and his supporters withdrew and organized the Institutional Missionary Baptist Conference; he was president of this organization for several years.
