= Regular Baptists =

American and Canadian Baptist group

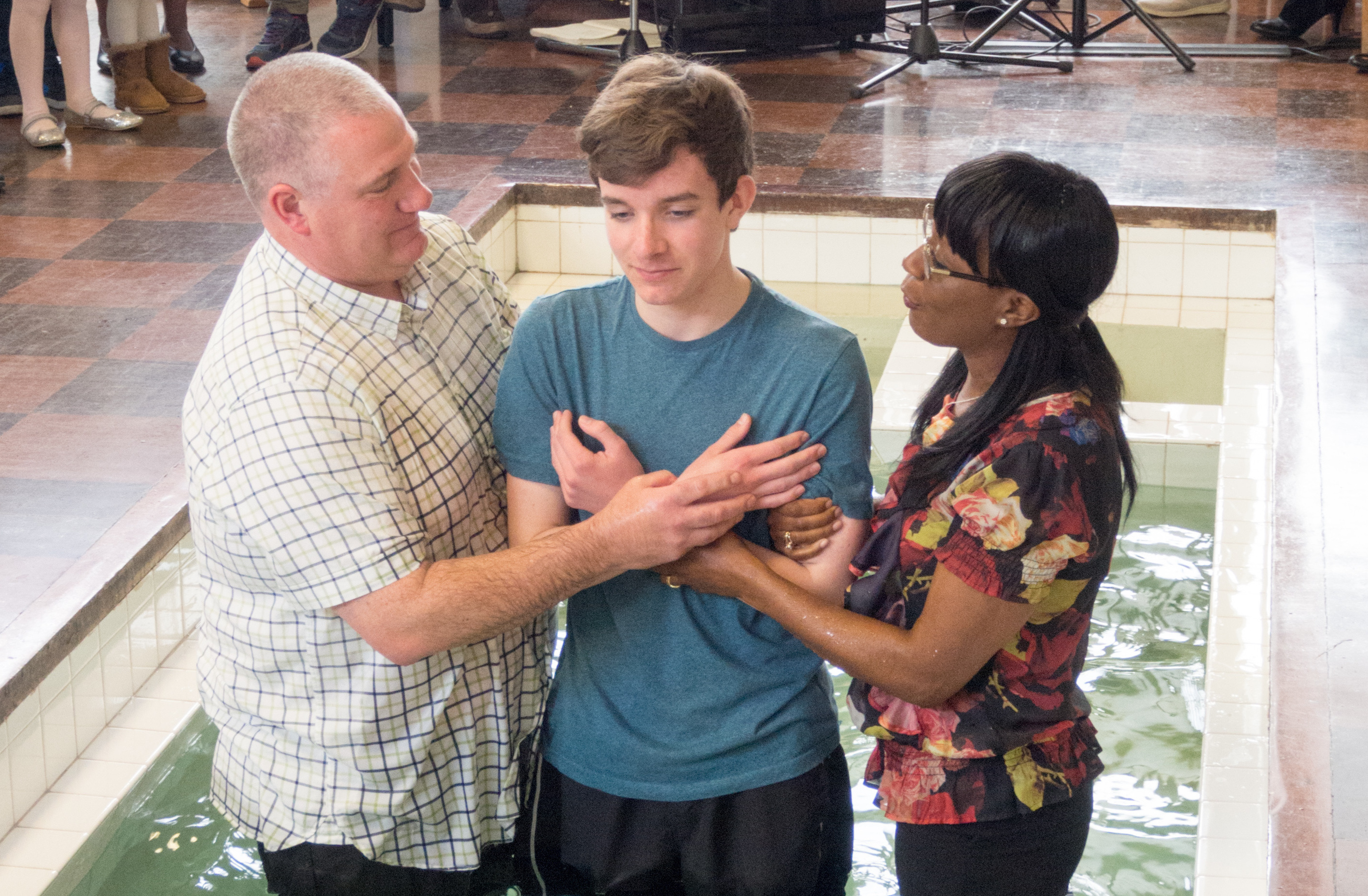

Regular Baptists are "a moderately Calvinistic Baptist denomination that is found chiefly in the southern U.S., represents the original English Baptists before the division into Particular and General Baptists, and observes closed communion and foot washing", according to Merriam Webster. This definition describes Old Regular Baptists, not those who formed as a result of the Fundamentalist-Modernist controversy.

The most prominent Regular Baptist group is the General Association of Regular Baptist Churches. While the term Regular Baptist was originally a reference to the Particular Baptists, it came to be used more loosely as a synonym for orthodox. The Baptist Bulletin of the GARBC defines them simply as groups who believe "orthodox, Baptist doctrine" and "affirm the rule or measure of the Scripture." (Note: In this case, the definition of the English word "regular" comes from the Latin term regula, which means "rule or example". For instance, the first edition of the Oxford English Dictionary definition for the adjective "regular" is: "Ecclesiastically subject to, or bound by, a religious rule, belonging to a religious or monastic order.") As compared to General Baptists or Free Baptists, Regular Baptists were strict in their beliefs, and also called Strict or Hard-shell Baptists. To be a Regular Baptist church in the GARBC is to hold to distinctive baptistic ecclesiology and interpret the Bible literally.

== History ==
=== United States ===
The term Regular Baptists developed in America from English immigrants who had been influenced by the Particular and General Baptists churches that were established in England. According to Stuart Ivison and Fred Rosser: "By 1638 there were also congregations of ‘Particular’ Baptists, who held that the Atonement was of particular application, i.e., for the sake of the elect only." The Free Baptists, however, believed that all people could reap the benefits of atonement. This meant, particularly for the western pioneers, that individuals that were baptized were allowed to become church members and take communion.

The number of Regular Baptists began to increase over the number of Free Baptists after the establishment of the Philadelphia Baptist Association (PBA) in 1707, which in 1742 developed a confession of faith. (Note: The Confession of Faith was heavily influenced by the 1646 Presbyterian Westminster and the 1689 Second London Confessions of Faith.) The influence and mission program of the Philadelphia Baptists shifted many of the Free Baptists to Regular Baptists. John Asplund traveled the United States and created the first comprehensive list of Baptist denominations in the United States in 1790 entitled Annual Register of the Baptist Denomination in America. He found that the greatest number of Baptist churches at that time were Regular Baptist churches.

In the 1800s, the term Regular Baptist came to describe the Free Baptists. This was a surprising change as the term regular initially described the opposing position to the Free Baptists (i.e., particular atonement). This happened as a result of the strict view of communion they took which held that individuals must be baptized prior to partaking of the Lord's Table.

Between the late 19th and early 20th centuries, the Northern Baptist Convention included individuals who were adopting the higher-critical theories of German theologians. This caused many to separate from the convention and to form several groups of conservative, Fundamentalist Baptists. During this, the General Association of Regular Baptist Churches was born. Their designation as Regular Baptists was unrelated to the dispute over general and particular atonement.

There are still a number of organizations that are considered Regular Baptists, but the degree of strictness regarding atonement beliefs may vary across Regular Baptists churches today.

- Old Regular Baptists is a group formed in Kentucky in 1825 from the New Salem Association of United Baptists, which was formed in Kentucky in 1825. After several name changes, its name has been Old Regular since 1892. They practice foot washing and observe closed communion.
- The Sovereign Grace Association of Old Regular Baptist Churches of Jesus Christ conducts many of the practices of the Old Regular Baptists, but consider themselves more conservative.
- The General Association of Regular Baptist Churches — organized in 1932 by conservative and fundamentalist churches withdrawing from the Northern Baptist Convention (now American Baptist Churches). Today, there are more than 1,200 churches in their association. Unlike other Regular Baptist groups, they are primarily in the North, they do not practice foot washing as an ordinance, and they take no position on calvinism. They manage and operate Regular Baptist Press, the publishing arm of their association. They are headquartered in Elgin, Illinois.

=== Canada ===
The term Regular Baptists denotes churches with strict, orthodox Baptist beliefs. In 1928, the Union of Regular Baptist Churches was formed in Hamilton, Ontario. It was succeeded in 1957 by the Association of Regular Baptist Churches of Ontario, Canada, which continues to uphold closed communion teaching and practice.

== Related organizations ==
- Union Baptists — a strand of Regular Baptists that owes its origin to the Civil War. Churches and associations, especially in border states, were rent asunder by this national conflict. Tensions over secession, war and reconstruction, as well as the fact that Primitive Baptists did not allow members to hold membership in secret societies, combined to incubate the Union Baptists. Many pro-Union Primitive Baptists joined Union Leagues and were expelled from their churches and associations. The Mountain Union Association, formed in 1867, was the first "Union" Baptist Association. Unlike other areas, this distinction, at least in name, has persisted, and some churches and associations consider themselves "Union Baptists". There seems to be no doctrinal distinction between Union Baptists and Regular Baptists. Three associations — Original Mountain Union, Primitive and Union — have about 3300 members in 36 churches. Mitchell River Union Baptist Association may still be in existence.
- Regular Baptists — found in 5 local associations; much like the Old Regular Baptists, and located in the same region, but more open to changes in worship and lifestyle. Churches have allowed notated hymnals, Sunday Schools, revivals and even instrumental music. Three associations, mostly in North Carolina, are in correspondence — Little River, Little Valley and Mountain Union (708 members in 15 churches in 1999). Two others are in isolated areas and not connected to the first three — East Washington in Arkansas (1560 members in 10 churches in 1999) and Enterprise in Ohio, Kentucky and bordering areas (4288 members in 63 churches in 1999).
- Fellowship of Evangelical Baptist Churches in Canada — although the FEBCC is not generally considered Regular Baptist, some churches of this Fellowship still carry Regular Baptist as part of their name, especially in British Columbia. Three of four major bodies forming and entering the FEBCC from 1953 to 1965 were Regular Baptist.
- Canadian Baptists of Ontario and Quebec (CBOQ) — Many Baptist churches were once Regular Baptist Churches. The CBOQ exists to equip churches and leaders to engage with their mission from God in their community.

== Notable members ==
- Thomas and Nancy Lincoln, President Abraham Lincoln's parents, were members of the Licking-Locust Association of Regular Baptists in Kentucky.
- Taylor I. Record, an Indiana state legislator, was a Regular Baptist.

== See also ==
- Primitive Baptists
