= Liberty Baptist Fellowship =

Liberty Baptist Fellowship is a fellowship of independent Baptist churches that grew up around Jerry Falwell, Thomas Road Baptist Church of Lynchburg, Virginia, and Liberty University. Most pastors of the Fellowship are alumni of Liberty University. In 1994, the Liberty Baptist Fellowship had 100 churches, including the 21,000 member Thomas Road church, which was also affiliated with the Baptist Bible Fellowship International. In 1996, the Thomas Road church joined the newly formed Southern Baptist Conservatives of Virginia, thereby aligning itself with 3 Baptist bodies.

The Liberty Baptist Fellowship (LBF) was started in 1981 with the mission of planting New Testament local churches and endorsing chaplains in the military. Since then, hundreds of churches have been planted and 24 chaplains are currently serving around the world.

LBF pastors/churches and their full-time staff receive a scholarship to the External Degree Program at Liberty University and its schools. Many have taken advantage of this scholarship. In addition, students sent from churches to Liberty University receive a scholarship.

== See also ==
- Thomas Road Baptist Church
- Liberty University
- Jerry Falwell Ministries
- Southern Baptist Conservatives of Virginia
