= Independent Baptist Church of America =

The Independent Baptist Church of America traces its foundation back to a church organization by Swedish Free Baptist immigrants at Dassel, Minnesota in 1893. The body was initially known as the Scandinavian Baptist Church in America. In 1926 the denomination had 13 churches with 222 members. The name Independent Baptist Church of America was adopted in 1927. In 1936, there were 5 churches in Minnesota with 82 members. In 1956, there were 2 churches with 106 members, and down to 70 members in 1963. The church ceased to exist in the 1970s.

== Reorganization ==
A church was reorganized under the name Independent Baptist Churches of America, by Rev. Kirk M. Livingood. He was ordained in Florida in 1986 by Rev. Robert G. Montanus. The IBCA was re-incorporated in the State of Iowa. The IBCA is the acronym for The Independent Baptist Churches of America, currently located in Iowa City, Iowa, U.S.A. Kirk Micah Livingood is the senior pastor & current presiding president of both the IBCA and the IBBCA.

The IBCA owns the Independent Baptist Bible College of America, also located in Iowa City, Iowa, U.S.A. (commonly referred to as the IBBCA). Religious courses are conducted both by classroom studies, and by correspondence studies. All students are required to attend 4 of the 8 yearly seminars in order to graduate from the IBBCA, and to earn their degrees.

The headquarters of the IBCA is: IBCA, Inc. P.O. Box 857 Iowa City, Iowa 52244-0857

There is no apparent historical connection between the historic Independent Baptist Church of America and the reorganized Independent Baptist Churches of America. Membership statistics are unavailable.
