= General Association of Regular Baptist Churches =

Baptist denomination in the United States

- Classification: Protestant
- Orientation: Baptist
- Theology: Fundamentalist Evangelical
- Polity: Congregationalist
- Region: United States
- Headquarters: Arlington Heights, Illinois
- Origin: May 18, 1932; Chicago
- Separated from: Northern Baptist Convention
- Congregations: 1,200 +
- Members: 132,900 (2005)
- Other name: Regular Baptist Ministries
- Official website: www.garbc.org

The General Association of Regular Baptist Churches (GARBC), established in 1932 is an Independent Baptist Christian denomination in United States, retaining the name "Regular Baptist". The association's home office is located in Elgin, Illinois.

== History ==
The impact of modernism on the Northern Baptist Convention (now called the American Baptist Churches USA) led to the eventual withdrawal of a number of conservative and fundamentalist churches. The Baptist Bible Union (BBU) of 1923 was the forerunner to the GARBC. The final meeting of the BBU in 1932 in Chicago was the first meeting of the GARBC.

The Association publishes Regular Baptist Press, a church education curriculum and the association's bimonthly magazine, the Baptist Bulletin.

In 2018, the GARBC had over 1,200 member churches.

According to the 2008 Yearbook of American & Canadian Churches, the GARBC reported having 1,383 churches and 132,900 members in 2005. Membership is concentrated in the Midwest. The states with the highest membership rates are Indiana, Iowa, Michigan, and Ohio.

== Organization ==
The GARBC follows a "fellowship" model rather than a denominational model. Each member church is free to act independently in all matters. The home office of the GARBC holds no controlling power over member churches. The purpose of the association is for fellowship between churches of like faith and practice.

== See also ==
- Baptist Distinctives

== Sources ==
- Baptists Around the World, by Albert W. Wardin, Jr.
- Dictionary of Baptists in America, Bill J. Leonard, editor
