= Oroko people =

Ethnic group in Cameroon

Oroko
Bareka-Batekka or Balondo-Bakundu

Total population
- 120,000 (200,000) 200,000 (including those of ancestral descent)

Regions with significant populations
- Cameroon (Southwest Region)

Languages
- Oroko

Religion
- Predominantly Christian and/or African Traditional Religion (Molimi-Ekpe)

Related ethnic groups
- Bakweri, Bakole, Wovea, Isubu, Bamboko, Mongo, Duala, Efik, Ibibio, Ewodi, Balimba, Pongo, Oro and possibly other Ngoe peoples

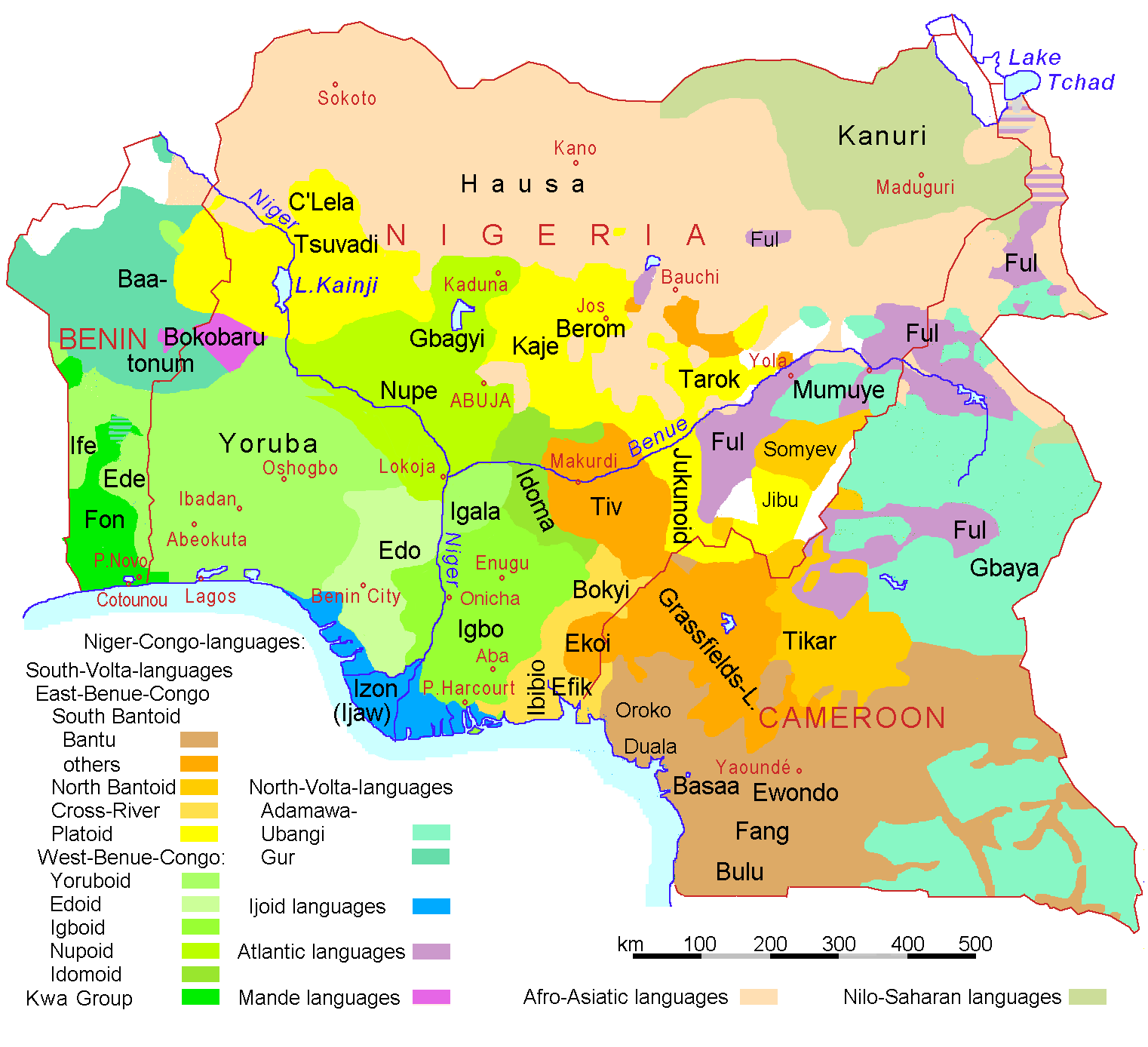
Languages of Nigeria, Cameroon and Benin

The Oroko (also Bareka/Batekka) are an ethnic group in Cameroon. They belong to the coastal Bantu group, widely known as Sawa, and primarily occupy the Ndian and Meme divisions of the Southwest Region of Cameroon. The people predominantly speak Oroko, English, and Cameroon Pidgin English. The Oroko are related to several ethnic groups (or tribes) in Cameroon's coastal areas, with whom they share a common traditional origin, and similar histories and cultures. These include the Bakweri (Kwe), Bakole, Duala, Ewodi, the Bodiman, the Pongo, the Bamboko, the Isubu (Isuwu or Bimbians), the Limba (or Malimba), the Mungo, and the Wovea.

== Geography ==
The Oroko occupy the Ndian and Meme mangrove plains as well as the most part of the Rumpi Hills towards the Bakossi Mountains to the northeast and the Ejagham forest to the northwest. The Ndian and Meme rivers, together with the Massaka and Mukunge rivers form the major watersheds of the Cameroonian coast, northwest of the Cameroons River. All rivers played significant roles in the migration and settlement of the Oroko people. There are currently 250 known Oroko towns and villages, the largest semi-urban center being Ekondo Titi and the largest indigenously settled community being Dikome Balue.

== Culture ==
Very few Oroko communities are urban or semi-urban. Hence, the majority of Oroko people live in rural areas with usually large villages of over 3000 people. So much of Oroko culture is shared with the ethnic groups that surround them. The Oroko claim to have founded the Ekpe secret society, a type of masonic organization which traditional kept the peace in the Bight of Biafra, and its secret writing system, Nsibidi. The word, nsibidi, is possibly derived from the Oroko word, njibidi, which means "violence" or "chaos". Today, Ekpe has been popularized by the Ejagham and Efik-speaking peoples of Cameroon and Nigeria, as well as their diasporic communities in the Caribbean, in the form of Abakua. Apart from Ekpe, the Oroko also share several cultural traits with, especially, the Bakweri and Bamboko. The Malle (or Elephant cult) and the Nganya are some of their most visibly shared cultural heirlooms.

=== Language ===
The Oroko speak the Oroko language, a Narrow Bantu language which appears in Zone A.10 of Guthrie's classification. The Oroko language is a dialect cluster comprising nine dialects, namely: Londo, Lolue, Lokoko, Lotanga, Lokundu, Lokombe (Ekombe), Longolo, Loma (Bima), and Lombongi (Mbonge). Some linguists have treated these dialects as separate languages.

== Notable people ==
- Joshua Osih, politician and businessman
- N.N Mbile , Politician
- Mambe Churchill Nanje, Software engineer
- Justice Itoe Benjamin, State official
- Justice Abednego Kalla Bea, State official, Justice of the Supreme Court of Cameroon
