= Bantu religion =

Bantu religion is a system of various spiritual beliefs and practices that relate to the Bantu people of Central, East, and Southern Africa. Although Bantu peoples account for several hundred different ethnic groups, there is a high degree of homogeneity in Bantu cultures and customs, just as in Bantu languages. Many Bantu cultures traditionally believed in a supreme god whose name is a variation of Nyambe/Nzambe and ancestral veneration. The phrase "Bantu tradition" usually refers to the common, recurring themes that are found in all, or most, Bantu cultures on the continent.

== Traditional beliefs ==
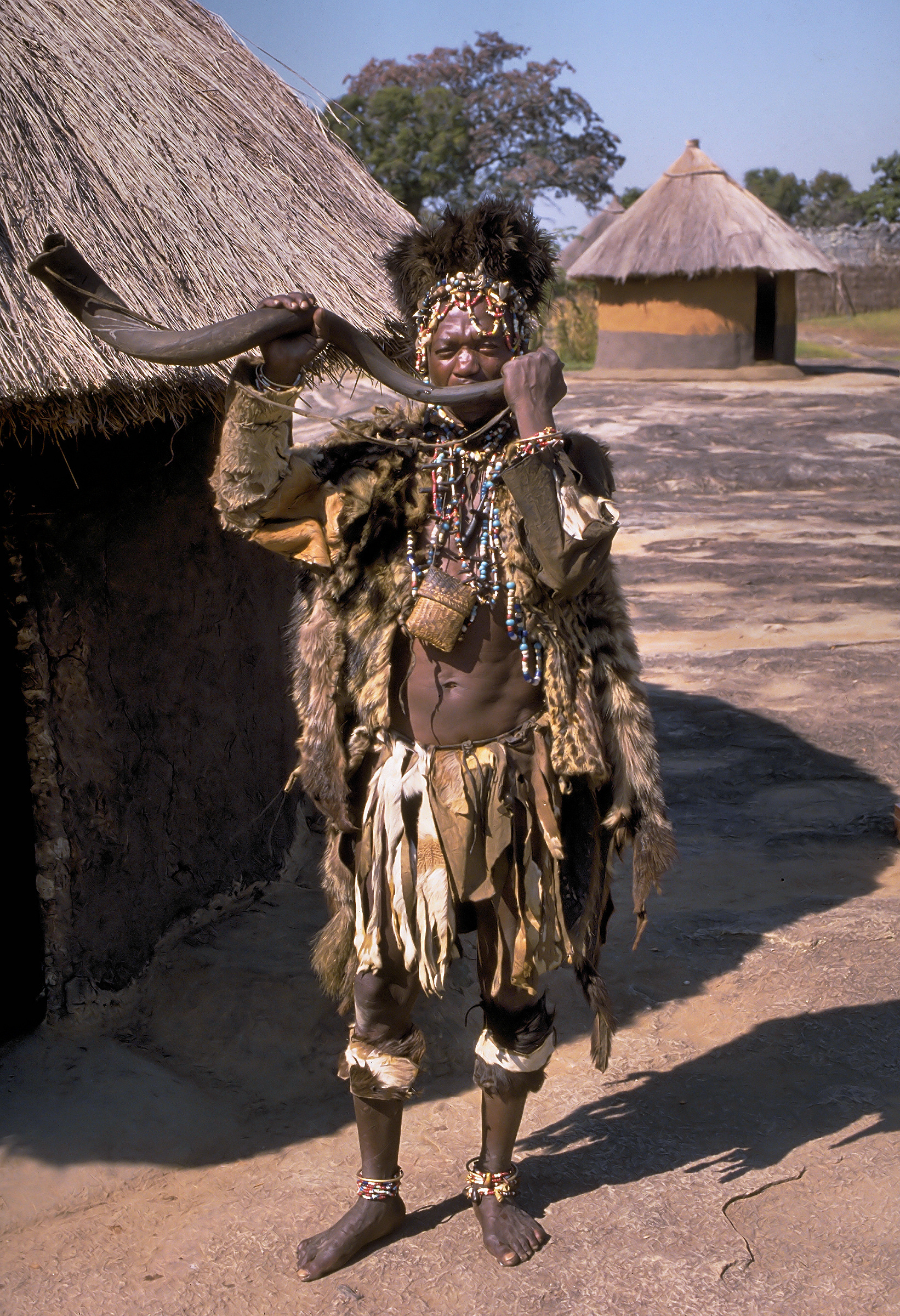
A Shona n'anga - a shaman and medicine man.

The traditional beliefs and practices of African people are highly diverse beliefs that include various ethnic religions. Generally, these traditions are oral rather than scriptural and passed down from one generation to another through folk tales, songs, and festivals, include belief in an amount of higher and lower gods, sometimes including a supreme creator or force, belief in spirits, veneration of the dead, use of magic and traditional African medicine. Most religions can be described as animistic with various polytheistic and pantheistic aspects. Animism builds the core concept of the Bantu religious traditions, similar to other traditional African religions. This includes the worship of tutelary deities, nature worship, ancestor worship and the belief in an afterlife. While some religions adopted a pantheistic worldview, most follow a polytheistic system with various gods, spirits and other supernatural beings. Traditional African religions also have elements of fetishism, shamanism and veneration of relics, and have a high complexity, comparable to Japanese Shinto or Hinduism.

It is suggested that most ancient traditional African religions, like most other indigenous folk religions around the world, were strictly polytheistic and lacked the belief in monotheistic concepts, such as a single supreme creator god. Native African religions are centered on ancestor veneration, the belief in a spirit world, supernatural beings and free will (unlike the later developed concept of faith). Deceased humans (and animals or important objects) still exist in the spirit world and can influence or interact with the physical world. Polytheism was widespreaded in most of ancient African and other regions of the world, before the introduction of Islam, Christianity, and Judaism. High gods, along with other more specialized deities, ancestor spirits, territorial spirits, and beings, are a common theme among traditional African religions, highlighting the complex and advanced culture of ancient Africa.

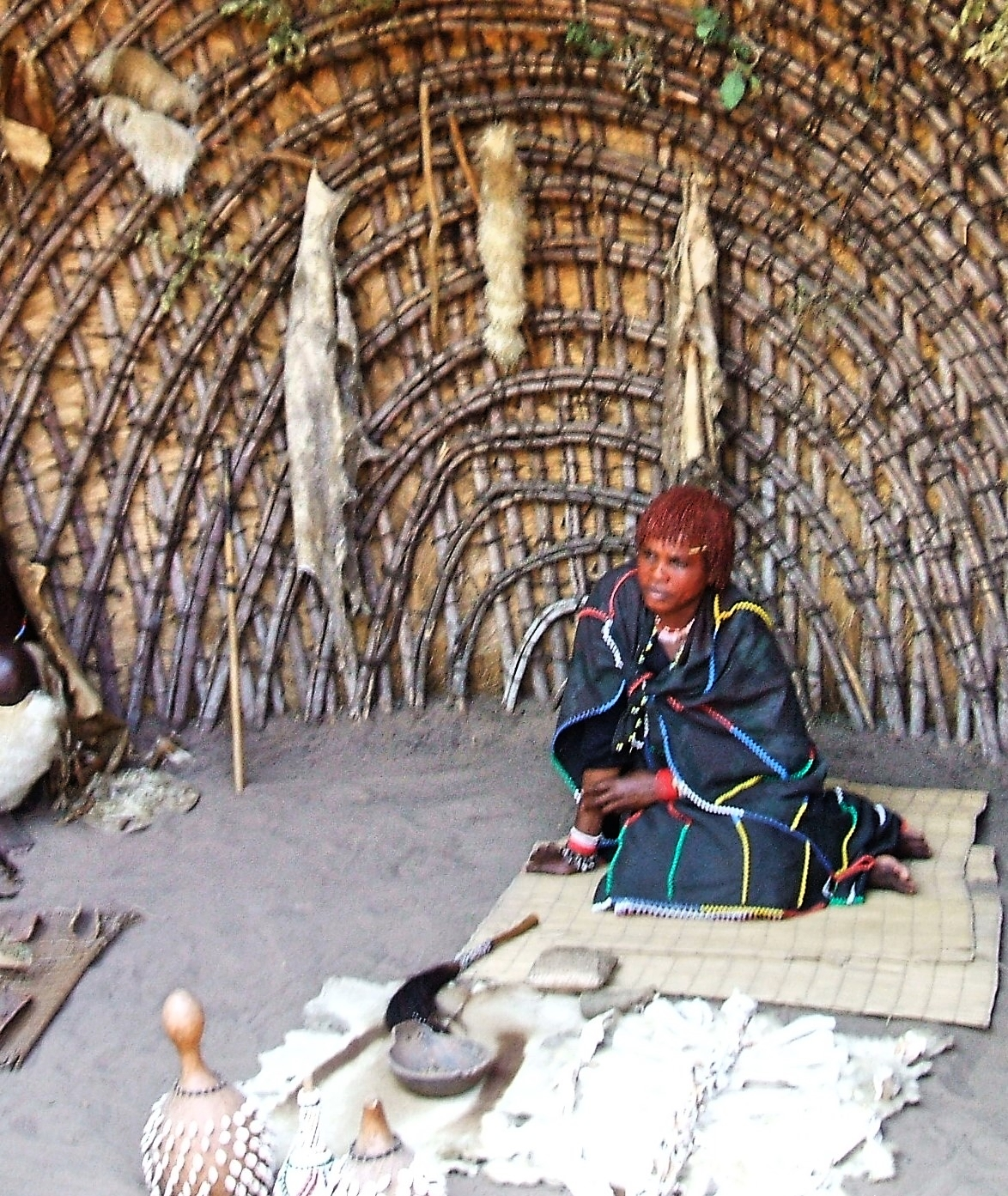
Zulu shaman and medicine women. Traditional African medicine is comparable with Traditional Chinese medicine, although much knowledge got lost after the introduction of Islam and Christianity.

Jacob Olupona, professor of indigenous African religions at Harvard University, described the Bantu mythology to be part of the many traditional African traditions, which are complex animistic religious traditions and beliefs of the African people before the Christian and Islamic colonization of Africa. Ancestor veneration has always played a significant part in the traditional African cultures and may be considered as central to the African worldview. Ancestors (ancestral ghosts/spirits) are an integral part of reality. The ancestors are generally believed to reside in an ancestral realm (spiritworld), while some believe that the ancestors became equal in power to deities found in African traditions.

The defining line between deities and ancestors is often contested, but overall, ancestors are believed to occupy a higher level of existence than living human beings and are believed to be able to bestow either blessings or illness upon their living descendants. Ancestors can offer advice and bestow good fortune and honor to their living dependents, but they can also make demands, such as insisting that their shrines be properly maintained and propitiated. A belief in ancestors also testifies to the inclusive nature of traditional African spirituality by positing that deceased progenitors still play a role in the lives of their living descendants.

Olupona rejects the western/Islamic definition of Monotheism and says that such concepts could not reflect the complex African traditions and are too simplistic. While some traditions have a supreme being (next to other deities), others have not. Monotheism does not reflect the multiplicity of ways that the traditional African spirituality has conceived of deities, gods, and spirit beings. He summarizes that traditional African religions are not only religions, but a worldview, a way of life.

The traditional ways of Bantu belief systems has been modified, to various degrees and in various ways, by the advent of Christianity (or Islam), as the God of Christians and Muslims has been equated to the Bantu supreme deity.

== Deities ==
The nature of the supreme and highest God of all gods and deities is often only vaguely defined or even lacking, although he may be associated with the Sun, or the oldest of all ancestors, or have other specifications. Most names of various deities include the Bantu particle ng (nk); some examples are Nyambe (Bantu), Nzambi Mpungu (Bakongo), Nzambici (Bakongo), Ruwa (Chagga), Mulungu (Wayao, Chewa, Akamba, Embu and others), uThixo or Qamata (AmaXhosa), Unkulunkulu (AmaZulu), Gulu (Baganda), Muluku (Makua), Mungu (WaSwahili), Mukuru (OvaHerero and OvaHimba), Kibumba (Basoga), Imana (Banyarwanda and Barundi), Modimo (Basotho and Batswana), Ruhanga (Banyoro and Banyankole), and Ngai (Akamba, Agikuyu, Aembu and other groups),(Umbundu),(Kioko, Bajokwe, Chibokwe, Kibokwe, Ciokwe, Cokwe or Badjok), (the other groups are Kavango people, also known as the vaKavango or haKavango, are a Bantu ethnic group which is divided into five kingdoms (Kwangali, Mbunza, Shambyu, Gciriku and Mbukushu). In many traditions the gods are supposed to live in the skies; there are also traditions that locate them on some high mountain, for example the Kirinyaga mountain - Mt. Kenya, for Kikuyu, Embu people, which is comparable to other traditional religions around the world.

== Beliefs by country ==
=== Cameroon ===
Among the Sawa ethnic groups of Cameroon, particularly the Duala, Bakweri, Malimba, Batanga, Bakoko, Oroko people and related Sawa peoples, jengu (plural miengu) is a water spirit, among the Bakweri, the name is liengu (plural: maengu). In Bakoko, they are referred to as Bisima. Miengu are similar to Mami Wata spirits. The miengu's appearance differs from people to people, but they are typically said to be beautiful, mermaid-like figures with long hair and beautiful gap-teeth. They live in rivers and the sea, and bring good fortune to those who worship them. They can also cure diseases and act as intermediaries between worshippers and the world of spirits. A Jengu cult is usually setup for worship of the Miengu.

=== Kongo ===
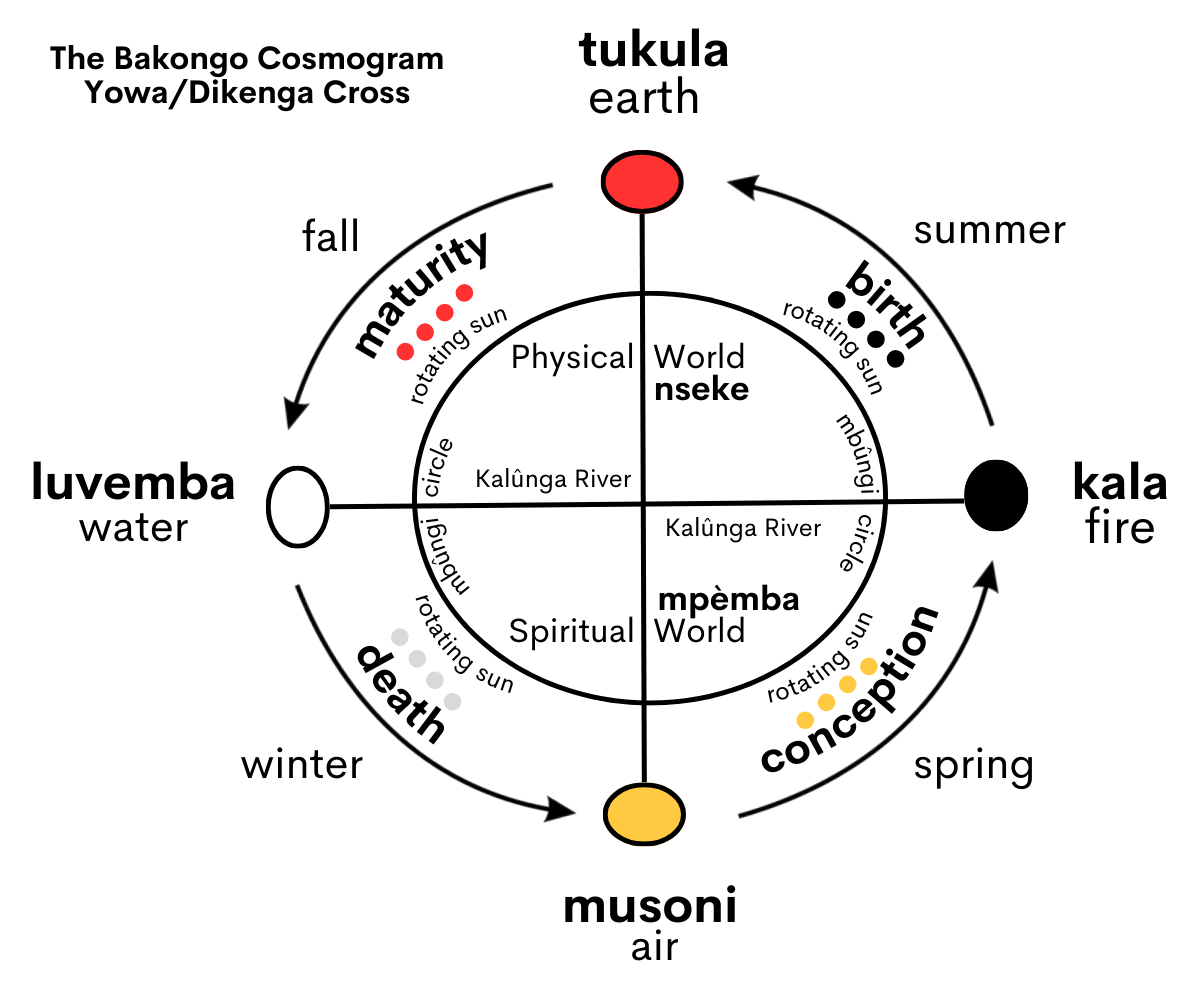
The Yowa/Dikenga Cosmogram

According to researcher Molefi Kete Asante, "Another important characteristic of Bakongo cosmology is the sun and its movements. The rising, peaking, setting, and absence of the sun provide the essential pattern for Bakongo religious culture. These "four moments of the sun" equate with the four stages of life: conception, birth, maturity, and death. For the Bakongo, everything transitions through these stages: planets, plants, animals, people, societies, and even ideas. This vital cycle is depicted by a circle with a cross inside. In this cosmogram or dikenga, the meeting point of the two lines of the cross is the most powerful point and where the person stands."

The Bakongo believe that in the beginning, there was only a circular void, called mbûngi, with no life. Nzambi Mpungu summoned a spark of fire, or Kalûnga, that grew until it filled the mbûngi. When it grew too large, Kalûnga became a great force of energy and unleashed heated elements across space, forming the universe with the sun, stars, planets, etc. Because of this, kalûnga is seen as the origin of life and a force of motion. The Bakongo believe that life requires constant change and perpetual motion. Nzambi Mpunga is also referred to as Kalûnga, the God of change. Similarities between the Bakongo belief of Kalûnga and the Big Bang Theory have been studied.

The nature of Kalûnga is also spiritual. As Kalûnga filled mbûngi, it created an invisible line that divided the circle in half. The top half represents the physical world, or Ku Nseke, while the bottom half represents the spiritual world of the ancestors, known as Ku Mpèmba. The Kalûnga Line separates these two worlds, and all living things exists on one side or another. After creation, the line became like a river, carrying people between the worlds at birth and death. Then the process repeats and a person is reborn. Together, Kalûnga and the mbûngi circle form the Yowa or Dikenga Cross. The four corners of the cross are believed to represent the four moments of the sun: Musoni Time, when the Kalûnga begot the universe; Kala Time, when biological life began; Tukula Time, when animals were created on Earth; and Luvemba Time when Manhûga, the ancestor of all humans, lived on Earth.

Relating to the creation of a Bakongo person, or muntu, the four moments of the sun also play a role in their development. Musoni is the time when a muntu is conceived both in the spiritual realm and in the womb of a Bakongo woman. Kala is the time when a muntu is born into the physical world. This time is also seen as the rise of the sun. Tukula is the time of maturity, where a muntu learns to master all aspects of life from spirituality to purpose to personality. The last time is Luvemba, when a muntu physically dies and enters the spiritual world, or Nu Mpémba, with the ancestors, or bakulu. Because Bakongo people have a "dual soul-mind," or mwèla-ngindu, they are able to exist and live in both realms during the different moments of their lives. Even while in Nu Mpémba, a muntu still lives a full life as they prepare for Kala time once again.

=== Namibia ===
In some Bantu myths, the first man was born from a plant: for example, he came from phragmites reeds in, and from a "Omumborombonga" tree in Herero mythology. Other traditions have the first men came out of a cave or a hole in the ground.

It can be noted that, as is the case with many mythologies, Bantu mythologies about the creation of man are often limited to describing their own origins, rather than those of all of humanity. For example, most Bantu peoples that coexist with bushmen do not include these in their creation myths (i.e., bushmen, animals and the rest of humanity, to be a part of the eternal universe rather than a part of the specific group or people).

== Death ==
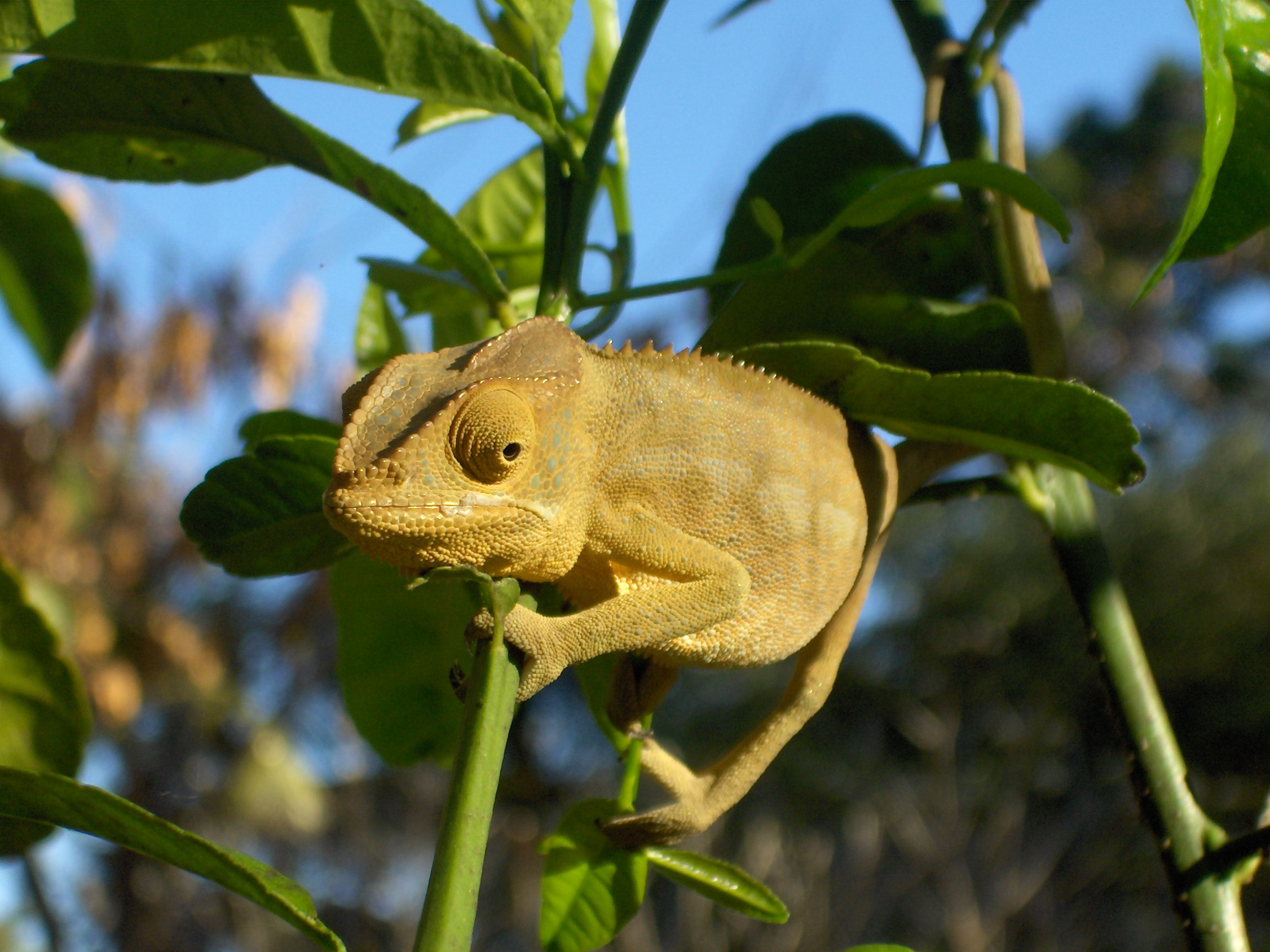
The chameleon is a herald of eternal life in many Bantu mythologies

Most Bantu cultures have legends and myths about the origin of death. According to one myth, a chameleon was sent to announce to men that they would never die. The chameleon went on his mission, but he walked slowly and stopped along the way to eat. Some time after the chameleon had left, a lizard went to announce to men that they would die. Being much quicker than the chameleon, the lizard arrived first, thus establishing the mortal nature of man. The Baganda in central Uganda believe that Walumbe—one of the three sons of the god of heaven, who escaped heaven and was thrown into an abyss by his brother—still takes the souls of the Baganda.

Traditional African religions generally believe in an afterlife seen in the way most of the tribes conduct their burials. Practices like burying the dead at midday so they could make it to the other world before night were common but have been left majorly to the rural areas. Some tribes carried out ceremonies where they would send the dead with messages to the other world.

Ancestors were believed to be in direct communication with the gods and sacrifices were made to them to plead on behalf of the people. Ancient Bantu religious beliefs have been left to undeveloped or rural areas. In some countries medicine men, the priests of ancient Africa, are looked at with scorn. This is attributed to the influence of religions like Islam and Christianity that prohibit witchcraft.

Ancestor worship is an important basic concept in most African religions. Some African religions adopted different views through the influence of religions like Christianity and Islam.

== Spirits ==
In most African cultures, including Bantu cultures, veneration of the dead plays a prominent role. The spirits of the dead are believed to linger around and influence the world of the living. This spiritual existence is usually not considered eternal; the spirits of the dead live on as long as there is someone who remembers them. As a consequence, kings and heroes, who are celebrated by oral tradition, live for centuries, while the spirit of common people may vanish in the turn of a few generations.

The dead communicate with the living in different ways; for example, they talk to them in dreams, send omens, or can be addressed by specially gifted seers. If they take any visible shape, it is often that of some animal (most likely a snake, a bird or a mantis).

The living, through clairvoyants and seers, may address the dead in order to receive advice or ask for favours. If a spirit takes offence in something done by a living person, he may cause illness or misfortune to that person; in that case, a clairvoyant may help that person to amend his mistake and pacify the angry dead. Catastrophes, such as famine or war, may be the consequence of serious misbehavior of the whole community.

As is the case with other mythologies, Bantu cultures often locate the world of the dead underground. Many Bantu cultures have myths and legends about living people that somehow manages to enter the world of the dead (kuzimu in Swahili); this may happen by chance to someone who is trying to hunt a porcupine or other animal inside its burrow. Some legends are about heroes who willingly enter the underground world in some kind of quest; examples are Mpobe (in Baganda mythology) and Uncama (Zulu mythology).

While Bantu cultures also believe in other spirits than those of the dead (for example, spirits of nature such as "Mwenembago", "the lord of the forest", in Zaramo mythology), these play a much lesser role. In many cases, they were originally the spirits of dead people.

One finds here and there traces of belief in a race of Heaven dwellers distinct from ordinary mortals. For instance, they are sometimes said to have tails.

== Mythology ==
=== Creatures ===
Bantu mythologies often include monsters, referred to as amazimu in isiZulu and Chewa language and madimo, madimu, zimwi in other languages. In English translations of Bantu legends these words are often translated into "ogre" or most commonly "(Spirits)", as one of the most distinctive traits of such monsters is that of being man-eaters. They can sometimes take on the appearance of men or animals (for example, the Chaga living by the Kilimanjaro have tales of a monster with leopard looks) and sometimes can cast spells on men and transform them into animals. A specific type of monster is that of raised, mutilated dead (bearing a surface resemblance to western culture's zombies) such as the umkovu of Zulu tradition and the ndondocha of the Yao people.

=== Folktales ===
The traditional culture of most Bantu peoples includes several fables about personified, talking animals.

The prominent character of Bantu fables is the hare, a symbol of skill and cunning. Its main antagonist is the sneaky and deceptive hyena. Lion and elephant usually represent brute force. Even more clever than the hare is the turtle, who beats its enemies with its patience and strong will. This symbology is, of course, subject to local variations. In areas where the hare is unknown (for example, along the Congo River), its role is often taken by the antelope. In Sotho culture the hare is replaced by a jackal, maybe due to the influence of Khoisan culture, where the jackal is also a symbol of astuteness while the hare is seen as stupid. Zulus have stories about hares, but in some cases the ferret takes on the role of the smart protagonist.

== Diaspora in the Americas ==
Bantu religion, particularly religion practiced by the Bakongo people, was brought to the Americas via the Atlantic slave trade. The spiritual traditions and religions that have preserved Kongo traditions include Hoodoo, Palo Monte, Lumbalú, Kumina, Haitian Vodou, Umbanda, Candomblé Bantu, and Venezuelan Yuyu.

== See also ==
- Kongo religion
- List of African deities
- Maasai religion
- Zulu religion
