= Jengu =

Water spirits in Sawabantu spirituality

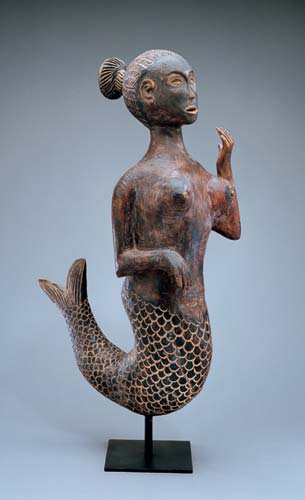
- Affiliation: Sawabantu, or Coastal Bantu peoples
- Symbol: Water
- Ethnic group: Duala • Bakweri • Limba • Bakoko • Oroko

A jengu (pl. miengu, also called bisima) is a water spirit in the traditional beliefs of the Sawabantu groups of Cameroon, like the Duala, Bakweri, Malimba, Subu, Bakoko, and Oroko people. Among the Bakweri, the term used is liengu (plural: maengu). Miengu are similar to bisimbi (singular: simbi) in the Bakongo spirituality and Mamba Muntu, who is present in many West and Central African cultures.

Described as mermaid-like spirits, they live in rivers and the sea, bringing good fortune to those who worship them. They can also cure disease and act as intermediaries between worshippers and the world of spirits. For this reason, a jengu cult has long enjoyed popularity among the Duala peoples. Among the Bakweri, this cult is also an important part of a young girl's rite of passage into womanhood.

== The water spirit ==
=== Appearance ===
The description of miengu varies by ethnic group, but they are typically said to be beautiful, mermaid-like beings with long hair and beautiful gap-teeth.

=== Beliefs ===
In the traditional spirituality of Sawabantu-speaking peoples along the coast of Cameroon, a jengu (pl. miengu) is a water spirit that acts as an intermediary between the physical world of the living and the spiritual world of the ancestors. They are said to inhabit both the ocean, rivers and lakes of Cameroon. Similar to a simbi in Kongo religion, a jengu is seen as a guardian of the natural world that acts as a spiritual guide and controls the fates of both human beings, or muntu, and animals in the waterways of Central Africa.

Because Miengu are associated with fate, they are also believed to bring good fortune to those who venerate them. As a results, Sawabantu peoples offer sacrifices to miengu spirits and hold extravagant festivals in their honor. These festivals are determined by the ruling families, who are members of a political body called the Ngondo. Once the Ngondo declare that a jengu festival will commence, an offering is then collected from the villages by jengu spiritualists. Referred to as the banganga in Kongo culture, Sawabantu peoples also have jengu specialists, or "Earth priests," who go through extensive training to learn precise rituals to understand and communicate with miengu. The night before the festivals, these specialists hold a sacred ceremony on Jebalé Islands in the Wouri River. The following day, they display the tribute to the Duala chiefs, who head the Ngondo, at a public ceremony on the beach. After the Ngondo see the tribute, a jengu specialist then swims the offering deep underwater, where they present it to the miengu on behalf of the chiefs. The specialist later returns with a prophetic message from the miengu about the upcoming year.

== Jengu cult ==
The Duala and related groups hold the jengu cult in high importance. The cult may have originated with peoples further west, possibly the Ijo, and then passed from people to people, reaching the Batanga at its most eastward extent. In the earliest days, jengu-worship centred on the water spirits as the source of four boons: crayfish, the end of the rainy season in one of the world's wettest regions, victory in the pirogue races, and protection from epidemics of disease. Among the Duala proper, membership was originally reserved to "free" (pure-blooded) Duala, a stipulation that even excluded members of the prestigious Akwa clan due to one of their ancestors being a Longasse woman (a Cameroonian ethnic group in the Sanaga-Maritime District in the Littoral Region). Observations by European traders and explorers prove that jengu-worship was well established by the early 19th century. Early missionaries largely failed in their attempts to suppress it.

The cult is still active in Cameroon's Littoral and Southwest Provinces. Both males and females are eligible to join, though this openness may be a fairly recent development. Jengu-worship is primarily male among the Duala, Malimba proper, but among the Bakweri, on the other hand, the cult is primarily for women.

=== Ceremonies and rituals ===
Jengu worship centres on a secret society led by an individual known as the ekale. This person traditionally wears a mask at all meetings, though this practice all but died out by the mid-20th century. Anyone can supplicate the miengu, however, and the simplest rituals involve nothing more than prayers or sacrifices to the deities before fishing or traveling by water.

Early jengu worshippers performed rituals in pirogues on the Wouri River, its tributaries and estuary, and on nearby islands. The person would first dress in ceremonial garb, a cape, skirt, and headdress of raffia fronds, and carry palm fronds and wooden paddles. He would then summon the miengu and offer them oblations of food and drink. He might also visit a jengu shrine further up the Wouri.

Much jengu worship is related to healing and medicine, and the miengu are called upon when mainstream healing fails. For example, a jengu doctor can treat a patient by first sacrificing a cock and goat. He then administers a vomit-inducing medicine and waves a small stool over the patient's head. The one treated must then follow a series of taboos. Among the Bakweri, this rite is known as Liengu la Vafea.

The highest-profile miengu ceremony today is the annual Ngondo celebration in Douala, first held in 1949. The night before the fête's culmination, members of the jengu cult hold a private ceremony at Jebale Island on the Wouri. There they sacrifice to the water spirits and prepare a package of gifts. The next day, this offering is presented to the miengu during a public ceremony on a beach near Douala. One cult member dives into the sea with the gift and stays down as long as possible. Afterward, he returns with a message from the miengu about the year to come.

The climax of the ngondo festival is the jengu cult. Wherein the traditional diver goes into the river under supervision of the traditional rulers. This undisclosed custodian of tradition, accompanied by a woman and two men, embarks on a ritual boat. He will then submerge himself in the middle of the river and stay underneath the water for three to ten minutes. It is believed that he visits the kingdom of their ancestors (spirits) beneath the waters. He returns with news of the successor of the ngondo presidency and a coded message from the gods of the land in a calabash. One mystery of this ritual is that the calabash, which the diver holds as he re-emerges from underneath the river, is dry.

=== Induction ===
The rites observed by the Bakweri people of Mount Cameroon serve as an example of similar rituals among other coastal groups.

Toward the coast, the Bakweri practice two major induction rituals. In the Liengu la Ndiva, cult members take a seizure or collapse as a sign that a young girl is ready for induction. A cult member then speaks to her in a secret liengu language, and if she seems to understand any of it, a traditional healer begins the initiation rites. The girl must live in seclusion for several months, during which she must follow a strict set of taboos and may see visions of spirits. She also receives a secret name and teaching in the secret liengu language. Eventually, the healer releases her into the custody of a group of strong men and a number of women singing in the liengu language. The men take turns carrying her until she reaches the middle of a stream. There, the healer plunges her in, inducting her into the cult. Meanwhile, other cult members attempt to capture a crab from the waters, as this animal represents the liengu spirit. The new member's taboos remain, however, and she must live in seclusion for several more months. Finally, the cult holds a feast in her honour, and the initiation comes to an end. The entire process takes the better part of a year.

An alternate Bakweri initiation ritual is the Liengu la Mongbango. If a young girl disappears into the bush, her female relatives try to track her down by singing to her in the liengu language and carrying cult insignia made of wicker. When they find her, they hide her away for several months (outsiders may visit, however). Afterward, the cult prepares a feast for the girl. She and her sponsor then go alone into the forest. The initiate dresses in traditional regalia of fern fronds and rubs her body with red camwood. She is then led back to the village tied to the middle of a long rope. Two groups play a tug of war over her until the rope breaks, and she collapses. The cult members call to her nine times in the liengu language, which causes her to stand back up. After a few more weeks of taboos, a traditional healer bathes her in a stream, and her initiation ends. This process also takes most of a year.

== In popular culture ==
- The Deep, a novella by Rivers Solomon, incorporates Black American folklore of a mermaid-like people, who are called wajinru in the story. They descend from the pregnant African women who were either thrown overboard or purposely jumped from slave ships, choosing death over enslavement.
