= Duala people =

Ethnic group in Cameroon

Duala
Total population
- Total: roughly 400,000 if one includes all the subgroups (Bodiman, Ewodi, bassa, Pongo, Mungo, Bakweri, Isuwu, Oroko, Bakossi, Balong, Mbo

Regions with significant populations
- Cameroon

Languages
- Duala

Religion
- Predominantly Christianity and/or African traditional religion

Related ethnic groups
- Bakole, Bakweri, Bamboko, Isubu, Limba, Mungo, Wovea, Oroko and other Bantu peoples

The Duala (or Sawa) are a Bantu ethnic group of Cameroon. They primarily inhabit the littoral and southwest region of Cameroon and form a portion of the Sawabantu or "coastal people" of Cameroon. The Dualas readily welcomed German and French colonial policies. The number of German-speaking Africans increased in central African German colonies prior to 1914. The Duala leadership in 1884 placed the tribe under German rule. Most converted to Protestantism and were schooled along German lines. Colonial officials and businessmen preferred them as inexpensive clerks to German government offices and firms in Africa. They have historically played a highly influential role in Cameroon due to their long contact with Europeans, high rate of education, and wealth gained over centuries as slave traders and landowners.

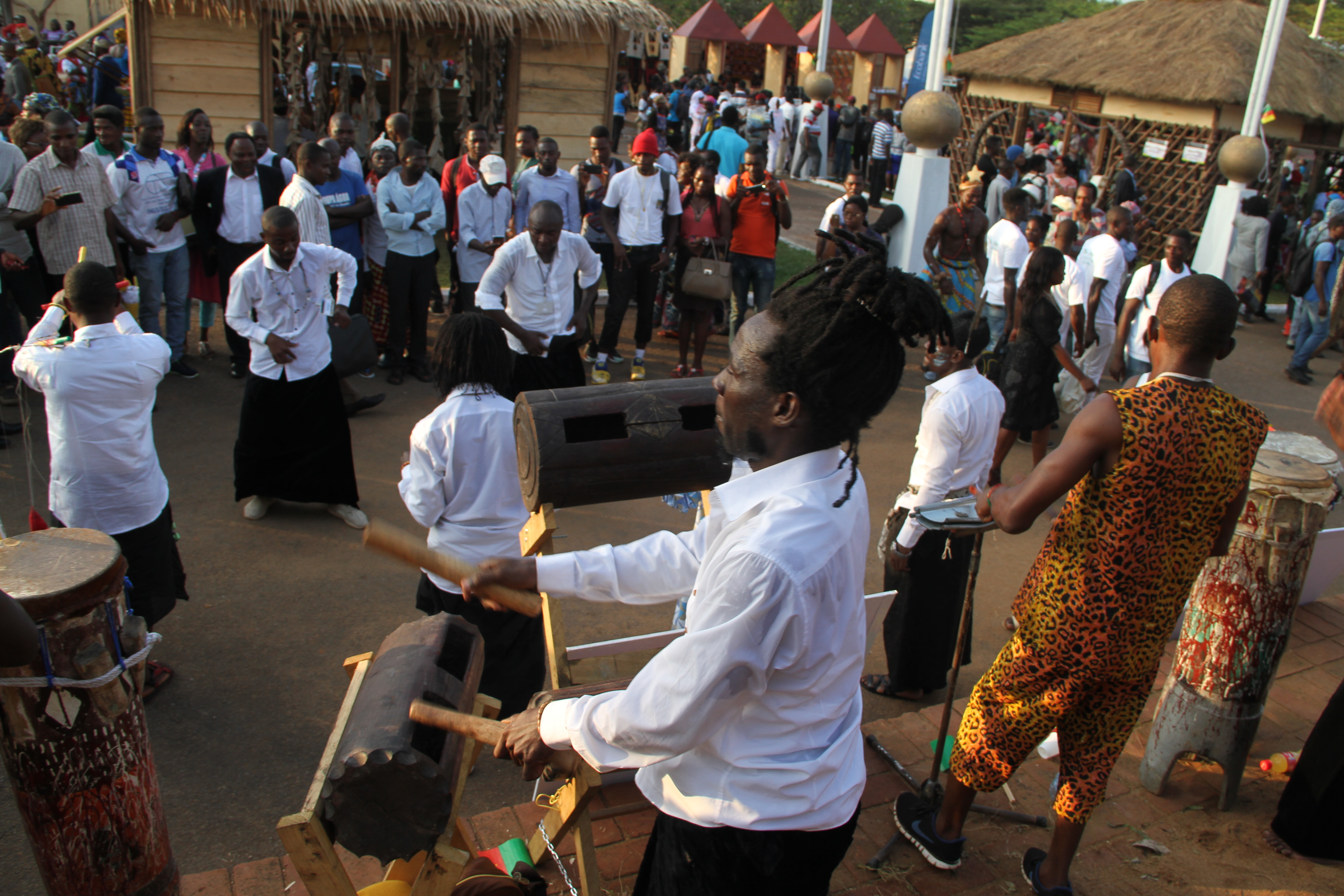
Sawa Dance Group

The Duala are related to several ethnic groups (or tribes) in the Cameroon Coastal areas, with whom they share a common traditional origin, and similar histories and cultures. These include the Ewodi, the Bodiman, the Pongo, the Bakole, the Bakweri (or Kwe), the Bamboko, the Isubu (Isuwu or Bimbians), the Limba (or Malimba), the Mungo, the Wovea and Oroko, they are generally known as the Sawa peoples.

The Batanga of the region of Kribi could be added to the preceding list as they claim they are descendants of Mbedi and they report some degree of mutual comprehension between their own language and Malimba.

Moreover, the Oroko language is classified as a Duala language, seems to be closely related to Batanga region of kribi and Bakweri (Mokpwe), which is a Duala language. Thus the Kundu, Lue, Mbonge, Ekombe, Londo ba Nanga, Londo ba Diko, Ngolo, Bima, Tanga and Koko are Duala (Sawa) people. The Duala have dominated the others historically, and these other groups all profess some sort of kinship to them.

In addition, many other coastal ethnic groups such as Balong, Bakossi and so on – who are culturally and historically more or less related to the Duala – are under Duala influence, and most of these people speak Duala to some extent. Duala is also spoken by a great part of the Bakoko people. The word "Duala" may refer to the Duala "proper" or to the whole set of Duala-like tribes or even possibly to some "duala-ized" Bakoko or Manenguba tribes.

== History ==
=== Early population movements ===
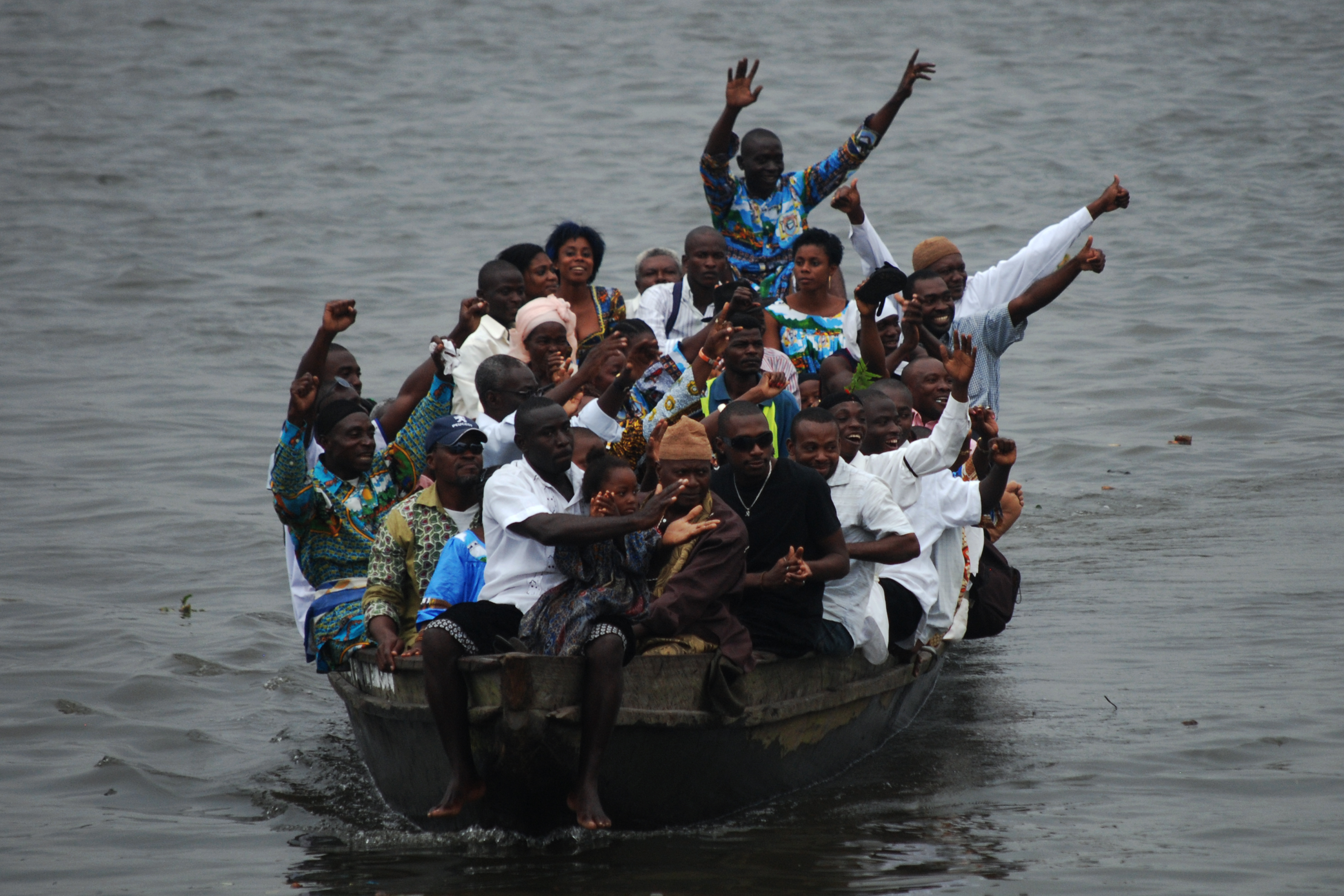
Wouri River

Early Duala history may only be conjectured from oral traditions. The Duala trace their ancestry back to a man named Mbedi, who lived in an area called Bakota in what is today Gabon or the Republic of the Congo. His sons, Ewale and Dibombo, migrated north and reached a place called Pitti on the Dibamba River. Here, the brothers parted ways after a row. Ewale moved to the mouth of the Dibamba with his followers and then northwest to the east bank of Wouri River estuary. Meanwhile, Dibongo and his companions migrated southeast to the Sanaga River and then split up, some heading upstream with Dibongo and others moving downstream with a man named Elimbe. Ewale's people became the Duala, and Dibongo's the Limba.

According to Duala traditions, the Bakoko and Bassa ethnic groups occupied the Wouri estuary when the Duala arrived. The Duala then drove them inland, a displacement that likely occurred in the late 17th or early 18th century.

=== Early history ===
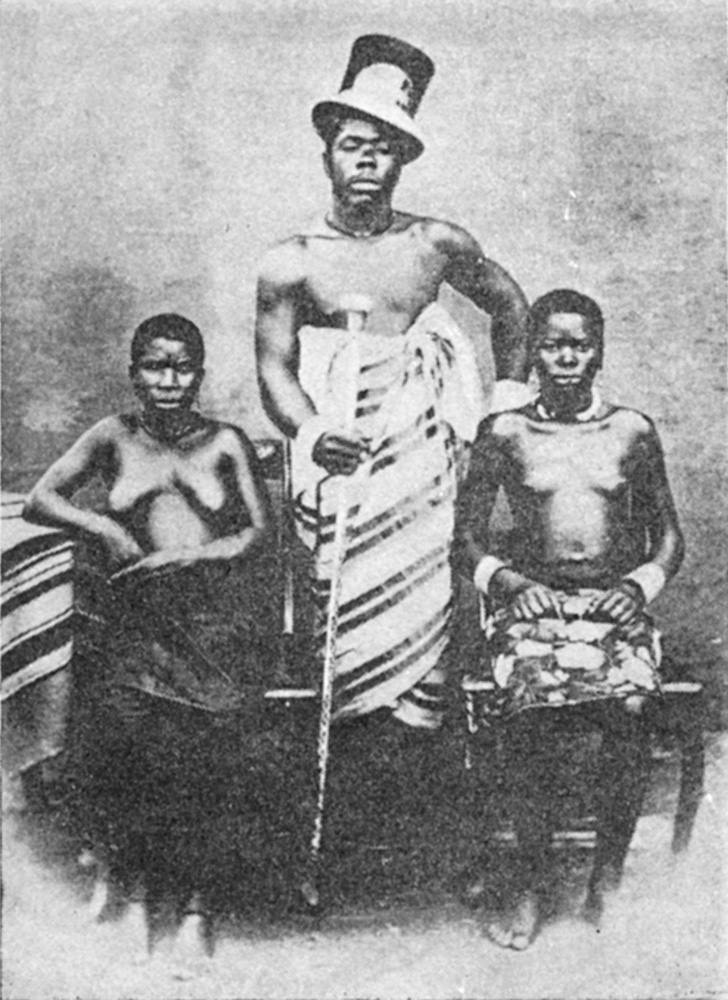
King Akwa, 1875

The Duala emerged by the 16th century as the leading traders on the Cameroonian coast, though the Isubu and Limba did not trail far behind. The earliest Duala merchants were likely chiefs or headmen.

The Duala had long kept and traded slaves, who lived in separate settlements and performed menial tasks such as cultivation. Slave owners could only trade their slaves to other Duala, however, and owners were responsible for paying their slaves' debts and arranging their marriages. With the Europeans providing such a hungry market, however, these customs gave way.

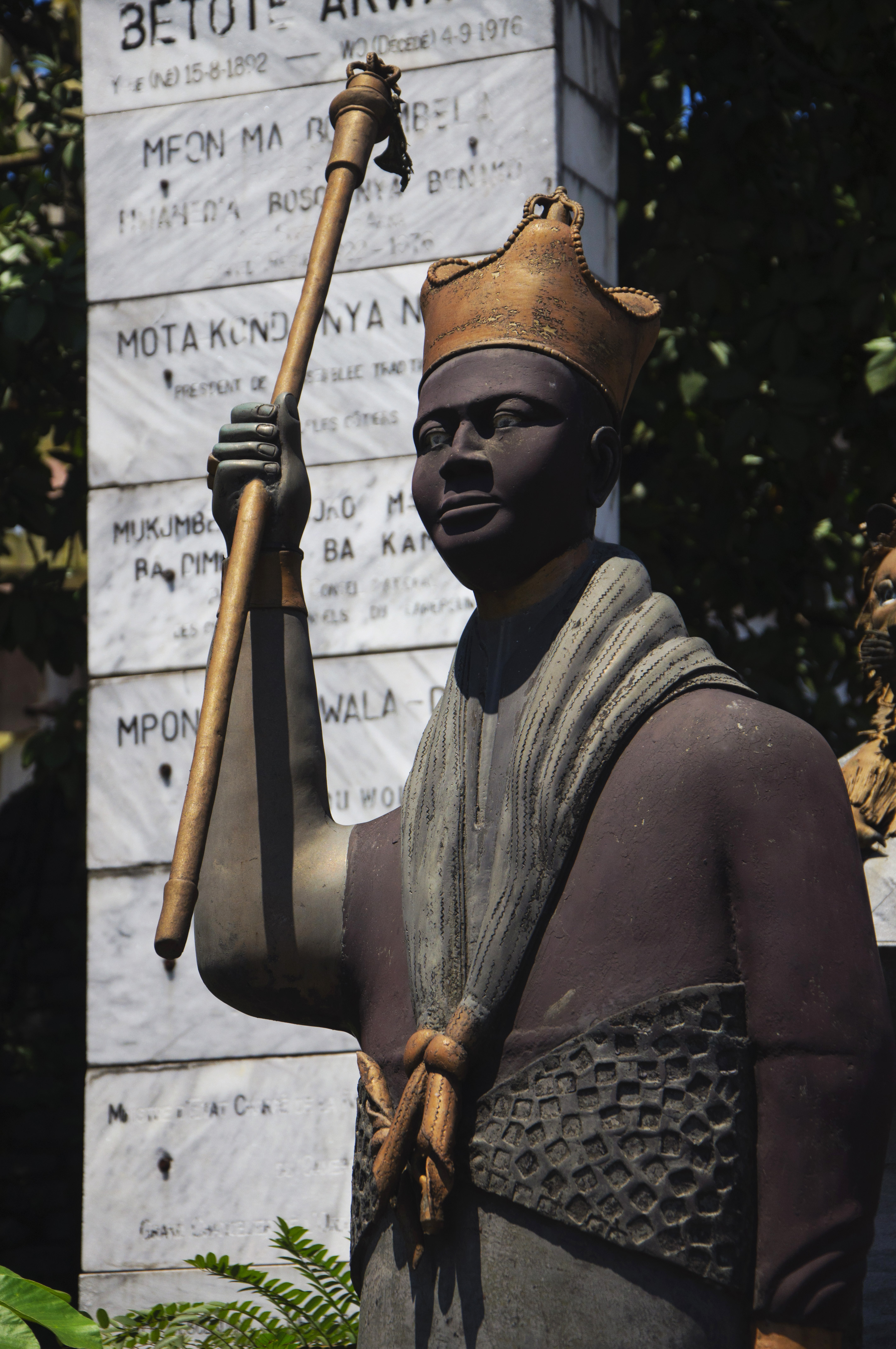
Monument of King Akwa

The main Duala villages soon grew into a prospering township named Douala for the people who lived there. The coastal Duala purchased goods and slaves from interior groups such as the Bakweri, Mungo, Bassa and Bakoko. In turn, they sold these entities (including slaves) to the Europeans, typically aboard their ships (and later at mainland factories or stores). In exchange, the Europeans provided alcohol, gunpowder, guns, mirrors, shoes, textiles, and tools. Ndumb'a Lobe of the Bell lineage propped himself up in the 19th century as King Bell. Heads of rival sub-lineages soon rivalled him, including the self-styled King Akwa (Ngando Mpondo) in 1814, King Deido (Jim Ekwalla) of the Deido (an Akwa splinter group), and Prince Lock Priso (Kum'a Mbape) of the Bonaberi.

By the mid-19th century, the British had taken the lead in trade with the Duala. This coincided with the abolition movement, and the Crown employed the traders to end slavery in the Gulf of Guinea. On 10 June 1840 and 7 May 1841, Akwa and Bell became the first to sign anti-slavery treaties. In exchange, the Europeans provided these rulers with annual gifts of alcohol, guns, textiles, and other goods. In addition, the rulers outlawed practices the British viewed as barbaric, such as sacrificing a chief's wives upon his death.

The British also wanted to mould the Duala to their own concepts of civilization. This meant educating them in Western learning and converting them to Christianity. Alfred Saker opened a mission in Douala in 1845. By 1875, numerous missions and schools sprung up in Douala and other settlements. The early missionaries learned the Duala language and invented a written form for it, as Bible translation was one of their earliest priorities. Cameroonian Pidgin English began to develop at this time.

Trade dramatically altered Duala society. European goods became status symbols, and some rulers appointed Western traders and missionaries as advisors. A high proportion of Duala grew wealthy through the new trade, and tensions arose between the haves and have-nots. Competition escalated between coastal groups and even between related settlements. Traders exploited this atmosphere and beginning in 1860, German, French, and Spanish merchants had established contacts and weakened the British monopoly. The Duala had gained a virtual hegemony over trade through the Wouri estuary.

In response to the threat from foreign merchants, the British put pressure on the Duala kings to request British annexation. In 1879, King Akwa sent such a request; Bell followed suit in 1881 (some historians believe that these documents were faked, however). When King Pass All of the Limba ceded his territories to the French, British traders expressed the urgency of annexing the Duala territories to the Crown. In July 1884, however, German explorer Gustav Nachtigal staged a coup by signing land-cessation treaties with Kings Akwa, Bell, and Deido. The British arrived too late and on 28 March 1885 ceded Victoria to Germany.

=== German administration ===
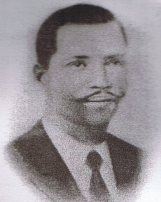
Rudolf Duala Manga Bell, hanged for high treason for opposing German land expropriations

Opposition to German rule followed the annexation. Prince Lock Priso still favored the British and staged a rebellion in December 1884. Around this same time, King Bell faced off against his own people, who were largely opposed to the German rule. Bell then found himself up against the other Duala chiefs in the Duala War, which was fought over the killing of a Bonaberi Duala and Bell's alleged refusal to share his profits with the other sub-lineages. Germany stopped the conflict when one of its nationals was killed. Bell survived, but his power had diminished significantly.

Realising that the Duala would never again follow the rule of a single king, the Germans instead played the competitors against one another. They supported the weaker King Bell to counter the powerful King Akwa. The Germans initially ruled from Douala, which they called Kamerunstadt, but they moved their capital to the Bakweri settlement of Buea in 1901.

Years of contact with Westerners and a high level of literacy had allowed a literate upper class of clerks, farmers, and traders to emerge. This class was familiar with European law and conventions, which allowed them to pressure the German colonial government with petitions, legal proceedings, and special interest groups to oppose unpopular or unfair policies. A series of these began in 1910, when the German administration initiated a new poll tax, attempted to seize lands in Douala township, and then tried to oust the native population from the town completely. King Bell's successor, King Rudolf Duala Manga Bell tried to rally resistance by sending emissaries to visit the leaders of island groups. Duala Manga Bell had many allies. Cameroonian kings held together. King Bell's closest ally, kindred and best friend was King Ekandjoum Joseph, whom he visited when he was persecuted by the Germans. The latter king resisted and refused until his death to cooperate with the German administration, which he did not trust.

German pretended that Ibrahim Njoya of the Bamum tipped the Germans off, and Bell and his collaborators were executed in 1914 for high treason.

=== British and French administrations ===
In 1918, Germany lost World War I, and her colonies became mandates of the League of Nations. France became the new steward of Duala territories.

The Duala continued to prosper. Though the French had largely stripped their kings of power, almost half of the ethnic group's 15–20,000 members were important traders, plantation managers or owners, chiefs, or clerks in the civil service by the 1930s. The rest of the people were fishermen and farmers. By the 1940s, many Duala had attained prominence as builders, as well, servicing the growing cities of Douala and Victoria.

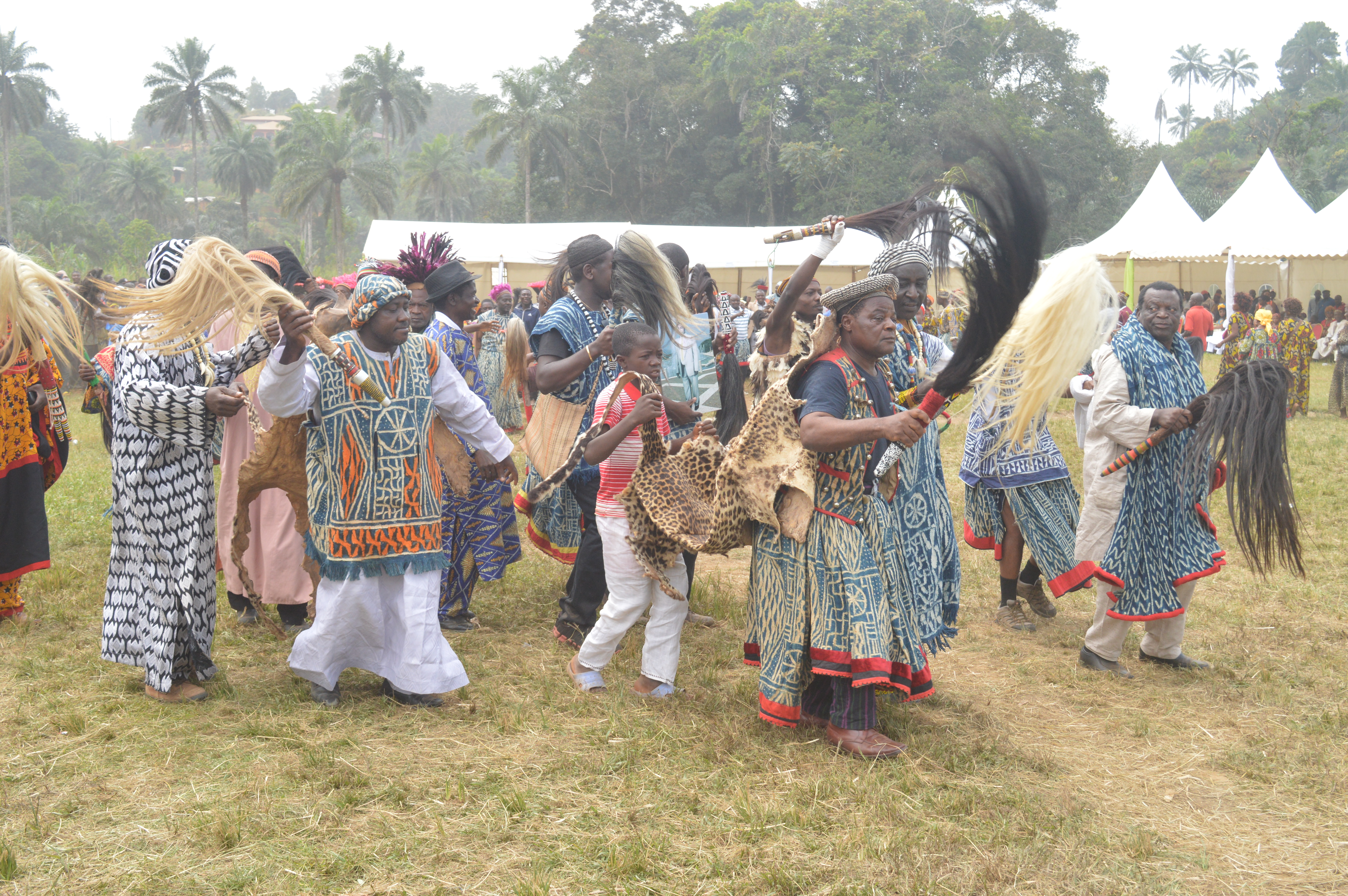
Bamileke people during a funeral celebration

The new colonials maintained the German policies of ousting uncooperative rulers and of impressing workers for the plantations. Individuals could opt to pay a fine to avoid the labour, however, which led to a dearth of workers from the wealthier areas. The French thus encouraged people from the interior to move to the coast and work the plantations (settled well away from the influence of the Duala chiefs). These immigrants were primarily Bamileke. The newcomers grew numerically and economically dominant over time, leading to ethnic tensions with the indigenes. By the early 1930s, the Duala were a minority in the town named for them.

On 19 December 1929, four paramount chiefs sent a petition to the League of Nations asking for independence for the Cameroons. Their largest concern, however, was the return of seized Duala lands. This Duala land problem reached a head in 1925 when the French sold lands on the Joss Plateau that the Germans had appropriated. In response to pressure from the Bell clan, the French offered other territory in compensation. The Bells initially refused, but the Great Depression eventually prompted them to accept the French compromise. The Bells gained land in Bali district, and the French promised not to take any of the Akwa or Deido clans' holdings.

In the late 1930s, Alexandre Duala Manga Bell had emerged as the unofficial leader of the Duala proper. In 1937, the French expelled the Duala from Akwa town (an area of Douala), although they allowed them to maintain ownership of the land. During World War II, the French and British showed favouritism toward white-owned plantations, and many Duala-owned farms became unprofitable . Meanwhile, other Cameroonian ethnic groups had caught up to the Duala's lead in education and Westernisation.

At war's end, the United Nations set in motion the decolonisation of Africa. The Duala remained important in this process. For example, many Duala supported the pro-independence Union des Populations du Cameroun party (UPC) when it first formed. Other parties that had either Duala founders or significant backing include the Bloc Démocratique Camerounais (BDC), and Action Nationale (AN).

== Geography ==
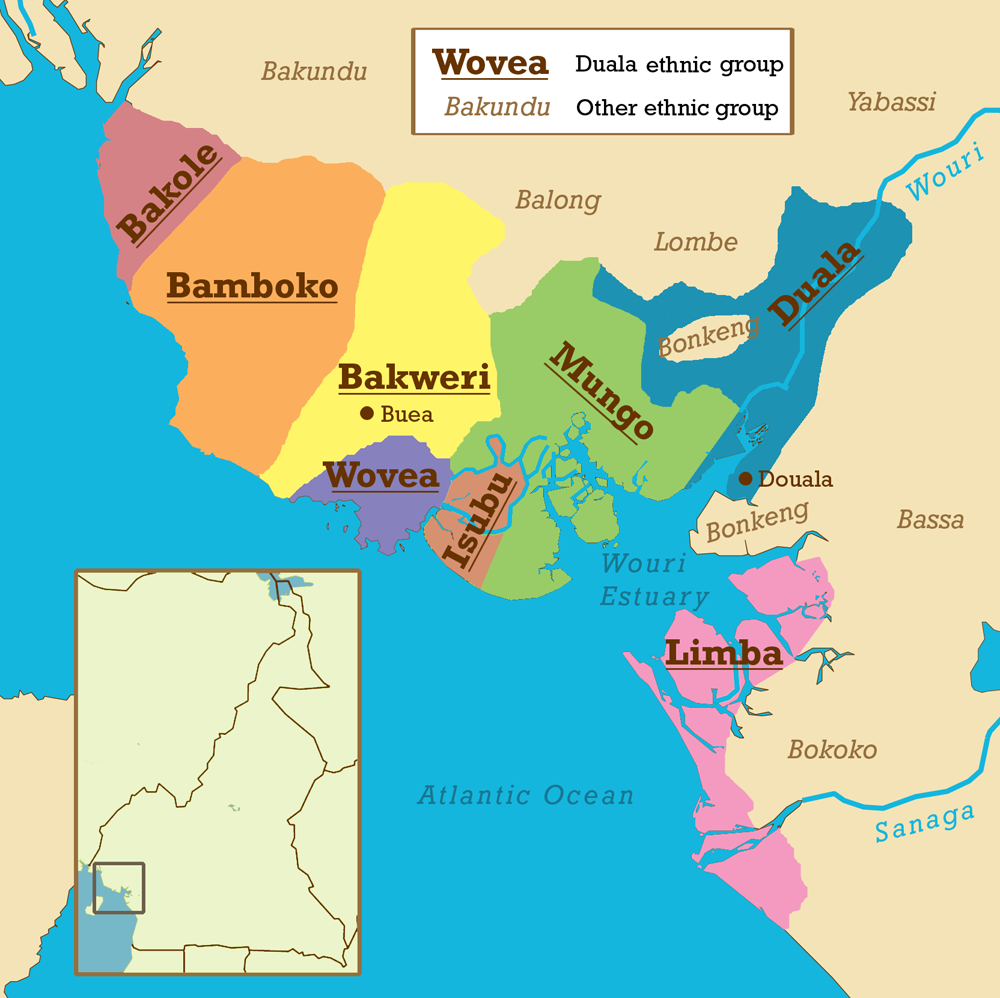
Map showing the location of the various Duala ethnic groups of Cameroon

The Duala are primarily concentrated in Cameroon's Littoral Province in the Moungo, Nkam, and Wouri divisions. Their settlements lie largely along the coast or just inland. The Wouri estuary, where the Wouri, Mungo, and Dibamba Rivers empty, forms the centre of Duala country. Douala is their traditional capital, and many Duala live in and around the city, although today it has come to reflect the diversity of Cameroon as a whole.

== Culture ==
The Duala today are divided into the urban and rural. Those who live in the cities, particularly Douala itself, earn a living at a number of skilled and unskilled professions. Many Duala still own parts of the city, allowing them to live off rents and development. The rural Duala, in contrast, work as fishermen and farmers, mostly at the subsistence level. Fishing is the trade of choice.

Traditional Duala society was divided into three strata. At the top were the Wonja, native Duala, with full rights of land ownership. The next tier consisted of the Wajili, either non-Duala peoples or the descendants of slaves. Finally, the Wakomi, or slaves, made up the bottom rung. Chiefs and headmen sat at the pinnacle of this hierarchy in the past, though today such figures have very little power in their own right. Instead, such individuals are more likely to own property and to have inherited wealth. Councils of elders and secret societies allow communities to decide important issues.

=== Language ===
The Duala language is a member Bantu group, closely related to other Duala languages, a dialect continuum including Malimba. Duala is part of the Niger–Congo language family. Duala is used as a trade languages, due largely to the spread of the tongue by early missionaries. This is particularly true among the neighbouring Wovea, many of whom speak Duala in lieu of their native tongue, and the Isubu, many of whom are bilingual in Duala.

In addition, individuals who have attended school or lived in an urban centre usually speak French, although English and German were more common in historical periods. The rate of literacy is relatively high among the Duala, though this is for reading and writing European languages.

At least until the German period, Duala men used a kind of "drum language", tapping out coded messages to communicate news over long distances.

=== Marriage and kinship patterns ===
Duala inheritance is patrilineal; upon the father's death, his property is split among his male heirs. The Duala have traditionally practiced polygamy, although with the introduction of Christianity, this custom has become rarer.

=== Religion ===
The Duala have been mostly Christianized since the 1930s. Evangelical denominations dominate, particularly the Baptist church. Nevertheless, remnants of a pre-Christian ancestor worship persist. As might be expected for coastal peoples, the sea also plays an important role in this faith. For example, Duala belief holds that their ancestors live in the sea. In this worldview, demi-human water spirits known as Miengu (singular: Jengu) live in the waters and mediate between worshippers and God. Traditional festivals held each year serve as the most visible expression of these traditional beliefs in modern times.

=== Sports ===
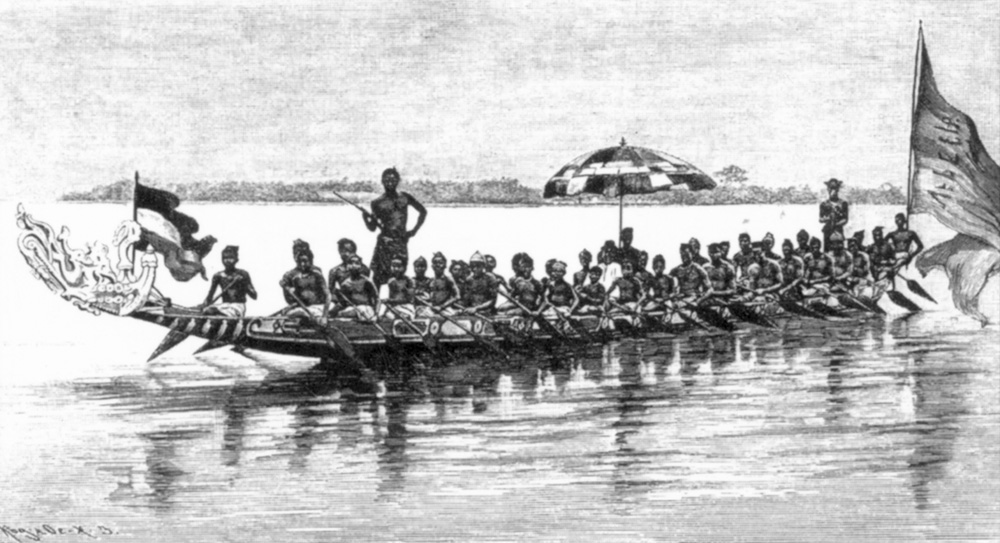
Duala war canoe, 1884

Pirogue racing has traditionally been the most important sport among the Duala. The sport reached its peak during the German colonial period, when organisers held races annually on 27 January (the Kaiser's birthday). Under the French, they became semiannual, occurring on 14 July (Bastille Day) and 11 November (Armistice Day). A typical Duala racing pirogue is 20–28 metres long with no keel and a bow carved with intricate designs. A team of 40-50 canoeists, mostly men who make their livings as fishermen, mans each vessel. In the past, diviners used the results of these races to predict the future, but today a Christian priest presides instead. Up to the late 1930s, a family on Jebale Island claimed to be able to summon the Miengu water spirits to help favoured participants.

Beginning in the 1930s, football has grown to eclipse other sports in popularity.

== Institutions ==
Assemblies, secret societies, and other groups play an important role in keeping the Duala unified, helping them set goals, and giving them a venue to find solutions to common problems. Chief among these is the Ngondo, an assembly of important chiefs. Another of these is the muemba (plural: miemba), a grouping of all Duala of a certain age range or tribal clan. The miemba serve to let their members network and socialise. Other secret societies include the Ekongolo, Jengu, Losango, and Munji.

== Classification ==
The Duala are Bantu in language and origin. More narrowly, they fall into the Sawa, or the coastal peoples of Cameroon.

=== Subgroups ===
In addition to the tribal distinctions already noted, the Duala further sort themselves into a number of lineages or clans. Among the Duala proper, these are the Bonanjo (including the Bonapriso), the Bonaku, the Bonabela, and the Bonaberi. These names represent the principal families in each clan: Njo, Priso, Akwa, Ebele-Deido, and Bell, respectively. In addition, the Duala sometimes include the Bodiman, Pongo, and Wuri among their ranks, but not as sub-lineages.

Notable Personalities: -Dany Priso -Jean Pierre Nsame -Christopher Wooh -Nicolas Elame -Dinos -Killamel -Mina Eyango -Engelbert Beleck Bell -Karl Etta Eyong -Felix Eboa Eboa -William Eyang -Eric Junior Dina Ebimbe -Gael Ebongue Makoube -Steve Mike Eyango -Kelly Anne Douala Edimo -Franck Dipita Njoh -Karl Toko Ekambi -Jacques Eyoum -Paul Roland Bebey Kingue -Blaise Eyong -Luderic Etonde -Henri Bedimo Nsame -Rose Mbenga Eyango -Nico Njalla -Marvin Elimbi -Karsten Ayong -Pierre Alexandre Douala Dipita -Prosper Mbongue-Muna -Thierry N'Joh-Eboa -Irene Bell Bonong -Cedric Doumbe -Alain Eyenga -Mike Priso -Henry Njalla Quan

== See also ==
- Rulers of the Duala

== Sources ==
- Austen, Ralph A.; Derrick, Jonathan (1999). Middlemen of the Cameroons Rivers: The Duala and their Hinterland, c. 1600–c.1960. Cambridge University Press.
- Chrispin, Dr. Pettang, directeur. Cameroun: Guide touristique (in French). Paris: Les Éditions Wala.
- DeLancey, Mark W.; DeLancey, Mark Dike (2000). Historical Dictionary of the Republic of Cameroon (3 ed.).
- Derrick, Jonathan (1990). "Colonial élitism in Cameroon: the case of the Duala in the 1930s". Introduction to the History of Cameroon in the Nineteenth and Twentieth Centuries. Palgrave MacMillan.
- Derrick, Jonathan/ "The 'Germanophone' Elite of Douala under the French Mandate." Journal of African History (1980): 255-267 online.
- Elango, Lovett Z. (1990). "Trade and diplomacy on the Cameroon coast in the nineteenth century, 1833–1879: the case of Bimbia". Introduction to the History of Cameroon in the Nineteenth and Twentieth Centuries. Palgrave MacMillan.
- Fanso, Verkijika G (1989). From Prehistoric Times to the Nineteenth Century. Cameroon History for Secondary Schools and Colleges. Vol. 1. Hong Kong: Macmillan Education Ltd.
- Fanso, Verkijika G (1990). "Trade and supremacy on the Cameroon coast, 1879–1887". Introduction to the History of Cameroon in the Nineteenth and Twentieth Centuries. Palgrave MacMillan.
- Friesen, Lisa (2002). Valence change and Oroko verb morphology (PDF) (Thesis). University of North Dakota. Archived from the original (PDF) on 20 February 2019.
- Gordon, Raymond G. Jr. (ed.), Ethnologue: Languages of the World (15th ed.), Dallas: SIL International.
  - "Duala". 2005.
  - "Isu". 2005.
  - "Malimba". 2005.
- Johnston, Harry Hamilton, Sir; Grenfell, George (1908). George Grenfell and the Congo : a history and description of the Congo Independent State and adjoining districts of Congoland, together with some account of the native peoples and their languages, the fauna and flora, and similar notes on the Cameroons and the Island of Fernando Pô. Hutchinson. ISBN 9780837118147. "The whole founded on the diaries and researches of the late Rev. G. Grenfell ... on the records of the British Baptist Missionary Society; and on additional information contributed by the author, by the Rev. Lawson Forfeitt, Mr. Emil Torday, and others ... With 496 illustrations from photographs ... and from drawings by the author, and 14 maps, etc."
- Lamberty, Melinda (2009). "A rapid appraisal survey of Malimba in Cameroon" (PDF). SIL Electronic Survey Report. SIL International. OCLC 956436862.
- Ngoh, Victor Julius (1996). History of Cameroon Since 1800. Limbe: Presbook.
- Stern, Theodore (1957). "Drum and Whistle "Languages": An Analysis of Speech Surrogates". American Anthropologist. 59 (3): 487–506. doi:10.1525/aa.1957.59.3.02a00070. ISSN 0002-7294. JSTOR 665914.
