= Kpwe =

Kpwe or Kwe may be:

- Kpwe people
- Kpwe language
