= Limba people =

Limba people may refer to:

- Limba people (Cameroon)
- Limba people (Sierra Leone)

== See also ==
- Limba (disambiguation)
