= Bakole =

Bakole or Bakolle may refer to:

- Bakole people of Cameroon
- Bakole language, spoken by the Bakole people
