= Mboko people =

Bamboko
Total population
- 4,000 (Wumboko speakers) (2000)

Regions with significant populations
- Cameroon

Languages
- Wumboko, Cameroonian Pidgin English, English

Religion
- Predominantly Christian and/or ancestor worshippers

Related ethnic groups
- Bakole, Bakweri, Duala, Isubu, Oro, Limba, Mungo, Wovea, Mbonge, Oroko, Ibibio.

The Bamboko are a Bantu ethnic group of the Republic of Cameroon. They are part of the Sawa ethnic groups, those who live on the coast.

The Bamboko probably moved to Mboko, the area southwest of Mount Cameroon, in the early 17th century. Predominant Bakweri, Mbonge and Isubu traditions claim they originated from this area, which supports the peoples' long shared histories and similar languages. They currently inhabit the west and northwest of the mountain, beginning at the villages of Sanje and Mukundage and continuing to the sea. This territory likes in the Fako and Meme divisions of the Southwest Province. Neighbouring the Bamboko to the east are the Bakweri and to the north are the Bakole. The Bamboko are primarily subsistence farmers who toil the volcanic soils of Mount Cameroon to cultivate cocoyams, maize, manioc, oil palms, and plantains.

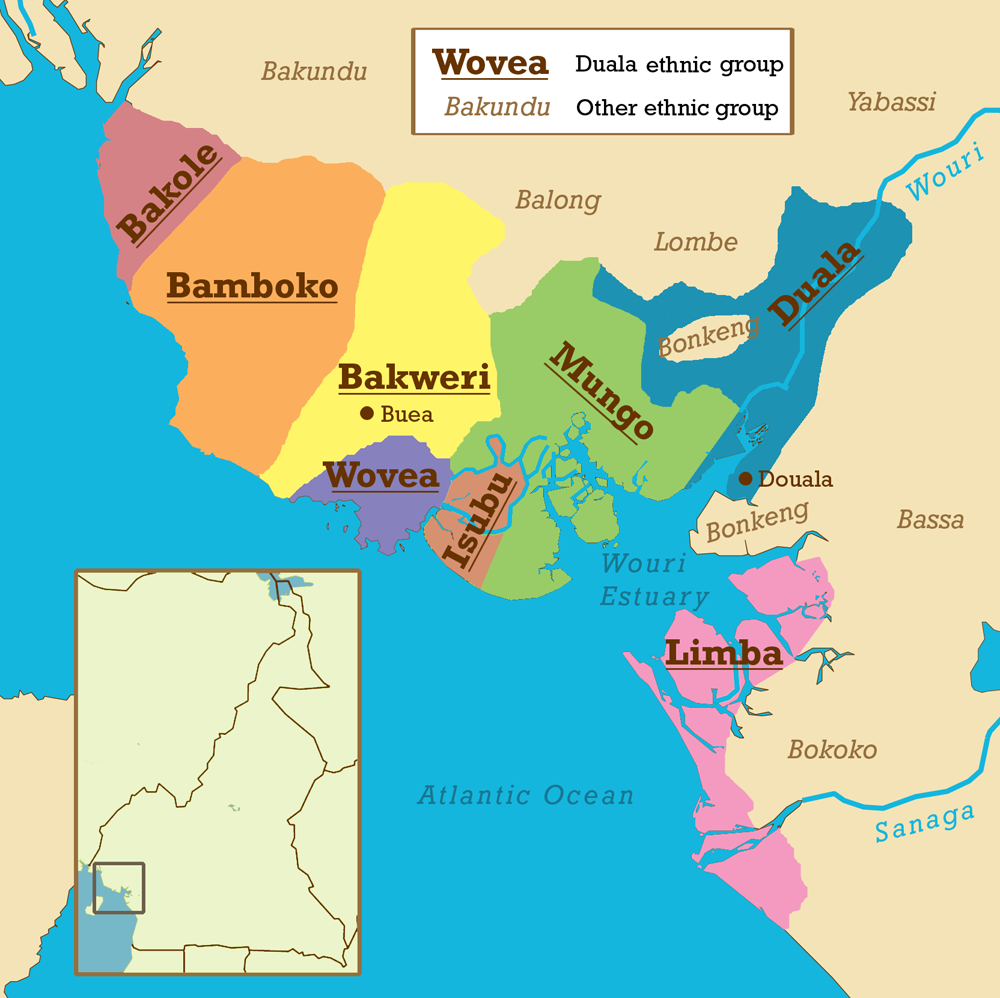
Map showing the location of the various Duala ethnic groups of Cameroon

The Bamboko speak Wumboko. The tongue is largely intelligible with Mokpwe and Bakole, and linguists sometimes classify Wumboko as a dialect of Mokpwe. All of these languages are part of the Bantu group of the Niger–Congo language family.

In addition, individuals who have attended school or lived in an urban centre usually speak Cameroonian Pidgin English or standard English. Increasing numbers of Anglophone Cameroonians are today being raised as first-language Pidgin speakers.
