= Qamata (disambiguation) =

Qamata is creator god of the Xhosa.

It may also refer to one of places in South Africa:

- Qamata, Eastern Cape, a small town, in Chris Hani District Municipality
- Qamata Township, township of Intsika Yethu Municipality
