= Lundu =

Lundu may refer to:

- Lundu, Sarawak, a town in Sarawak, Malaysia
- Lundu (dance), a Brazilian dance which originated from Angola
- Lundu language
