= Limba =

Limba may refer to:

- The Limba people (Cameroon)
- The Limba language (Cameroon)
- The Limba people (Sierra Leone)
- The Limba language (Sierra Leone)
- The Terminalia superba, a tree in West Africa
- The Pinus cembra, a local name of a tree in Carpathian Mountains
- Limba, Panchthar, a Village Development Committee in Nepal
- Limba, a village in Ciugud Commune, Alba County, Romania
- LIMBA, Long Island Metro Business Action, a business organization on Long Island in New York state
