= MZD =

MZD may refer to:

- Méndez Airport, the IATA code MZD
- ISO 639:mzd, the ISO 639 code for the Limba language (Cameroon)
- Moscow Railway, a subsidiary of Russian Railways
  - MK MZD, an orbital railway in Moscow
- Mao Zedong, former chairman of China
- Mark Z. Danielewski, American fiction writer
