= Mungo people =

Ethnic group of the Republic of Cameroon

Mungo
Total population
- Total: Fewer than 87,700 (1982)

Regions with significant populations
- Cameroon

Languages
- Duala, French

Religion
- Predominantly Christian, African Traditional Religion

Related ethnic groups
- Bakole, Bakweri, Bamboko, Duala, Isubu, Limba, Wovea, Sawa

The Mungo (Moungo) are an ethnic group of the Republic of Cameroon. Along with the other coastal peoples, they belong to the Sawa ethnic groups. The Mungo have historically been dominated by the Duala people, and the two groups share similar cultures, histories, and claims of origin.

== History and geography ==
The Mungo share no singular origin story, but there are two major theories.

Some claim the same history as the Duala and Limba, descending from a man named Mbedi. From a place called Piti (northeast of Douala), Mbedi's sons Ewale and Dibongo migrated south toward the Cameroon coast. Others trace their ancestry to a man named Lokula who migrated east from near Efik territory in modern-day Nigeria. The former tradition seems more likely, however, and the Nigerian story possibly indicates that later settlers entered Limba country from Efik territories at some point and assimilated.

By the 16th century, the Duala had become the leading traders in Cameroon. The Mungo provided goods and slaves to the Duala in exchange for goods obtained from the Europeans, such as alcohol, gunpowder, guns, mirrors, shoes, textiles and tools.

In 1918, Germany lost World War I and its colonies became mandates of the League of Nations. Great Britain and France split the administration of the Kameruns, partitioning the Cameroonian Littoral. The Mungo were divided in two.

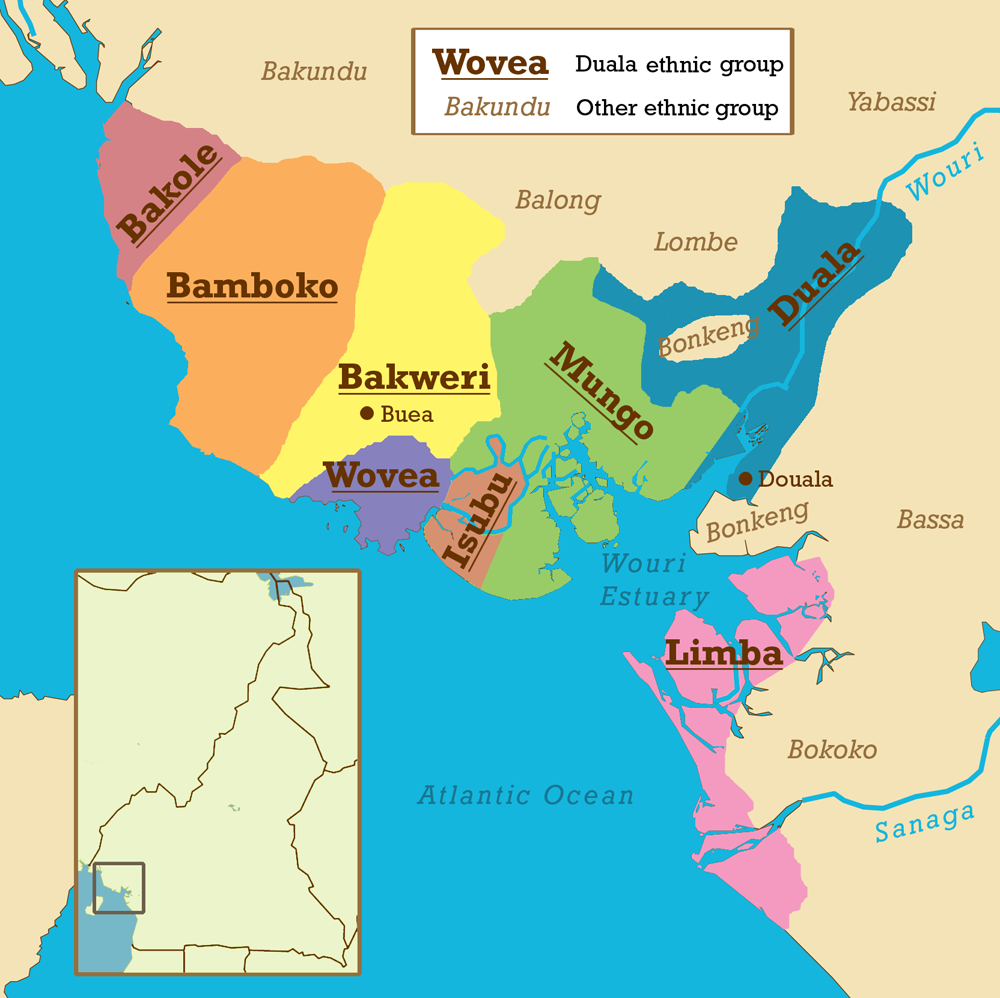
Map showing the location of the various Duala ethnic groups of Cameroon

The present-day Mungo people live along the Mungo River's lower stretch and the creeks that feed it. Their territory straddles the border of the Moungo division of the Littoral Province and the Fako division of the Southwest Province. Fishing is their primary means of subsistence.

=== Language ===
The Mungo people natively speak a dialect of Duala. Duala is part of the Bantu group of the Niger–Congo language family.

Individuals who have attended school or lived in an urban centre usually speak a European language. For Littoral Mungo, this is French; for Southwest Mungo, it is Cameroonian Pidgin English or standard English. A growing number of the Anglophones today grow up with Pidgin English as their first tongue.

=== Arts ===
The Mungo are regular attendees of the annual Ngondo, a traditional festival of the Sawa peoples, where they communicate with the ancestors and ask them for guidance and protection for the future. The Ngondo festivities also include armed combat, beauty pageants, pirogue races and traditional wrestling.

== Classification ==
The Mungo are Bantu in language and origin. More narrowly, they fall into the Sawa, or the coastal peoples of Cameroon.
