= Kole people =

Bantu ethnic group of Cameroon

Bakole
Total population
- Total: 300 (1982)

Regions with significant populations
- Cameroon

Languages
- Kole, Cameroonian Pidgin English, English

Religion
- Predominantly Christian and/or ancestor worshippers

Related ethnic groups
- Bakweri, Bamboko, Duala, Mungo, Isubu, Limba, Wovea

The Bakole (Bakolle, Kole) are a Bantu ethnic group of the Republic of Cameroon. They belong to the Sawa, or Cameroonian coastal peoples. The Bakole speak a language of the same name.

According to Duala oral history, the Duala, Bakole, and Limba come from a single ancestor named Ewale. From Piti, northeast of Douala, Ewale migrated to the coast to the east bank of Wouri River. The Bakole probably splintered from the Duala proper at some point and made their way west to their current territory. Today, the inhabit the coast directly north of the Bamboko people, along the Rio Del Rey and south of the Meme estuary in the Ndian division of the Southwest Province. Today, the Bakole farm the fertile volcanic soils of Mount Cameroon to raise cocoyams, maize, manioc, oil palms, and plantains.

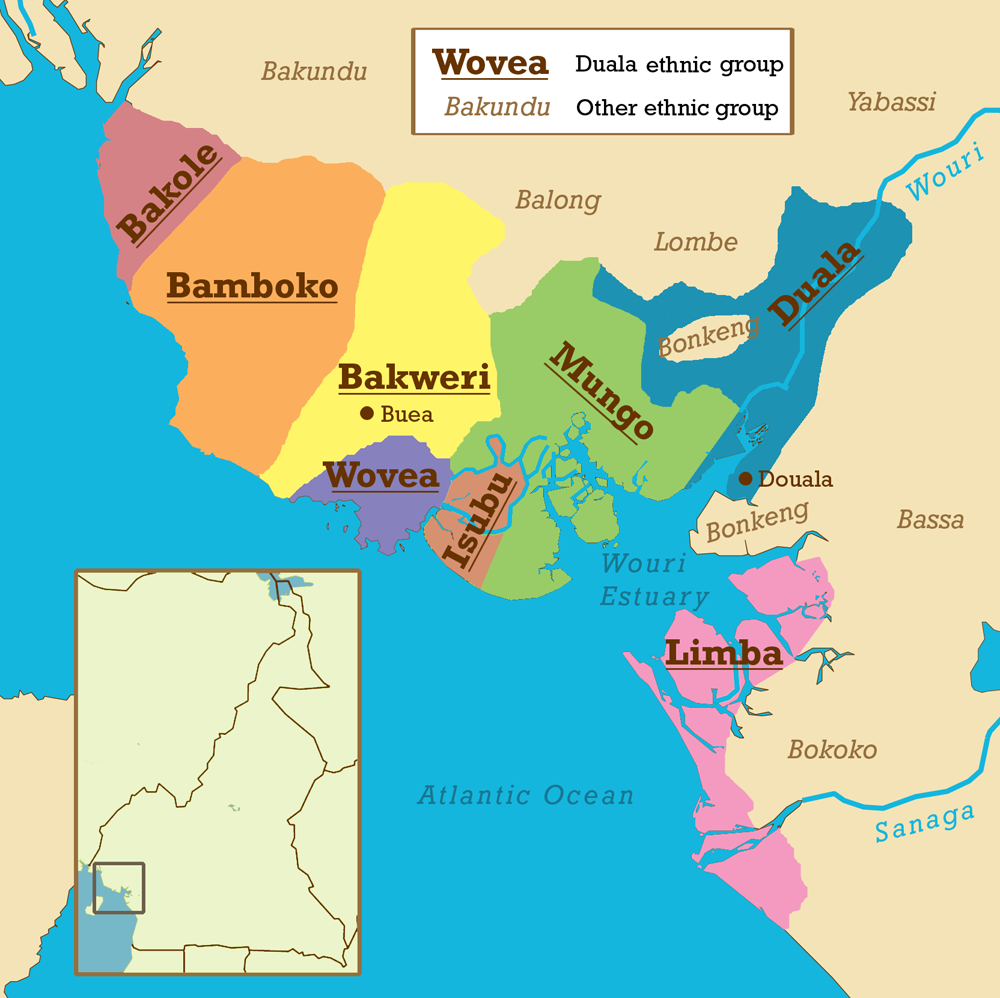
Map showing the location of the various Duala ethnic groups of Cameroon

The Bakole language is part of the Bantu group of the Niger–Congo language family. The language is at least partially intelligible with Mokpwe, the language of the Bakweri. Individuals who have attended school or lived in an urban centre usually speak Cameroonian Pidgin English or standard English. In fact, growing numbers of Anglophone Cameroonians today grow up with pidgin as their first tongue.
