= Tanga language =

Bantu language spoken in Cameroon

Tanga
- Noho
- Native to: Cameroon, Equatorial Guinea
- Ethnicity: Batanga (Banoho)
- Native speakers: (6,000 in Cameroon cited 1982); 9,000 in Equatorial Guinea (2001)
- Language family: Niger–Congo?: Atlantic–Congo; Benue–Congo; Bantoid; Bantu (Zone A); Sawabantu (A.30); Tanga
- Dialects: Puku (Naka, Kribi Bapoko); Nohu (Noko, Londgi Banoo); Tanga (Fifinda Batanga)

Language codes
- ISO 639-3: bnm
- Glottolog: bata1285
- Guthrie code: A.32

Tanga, or Noho, is a Bantu language of Cameroon and Equatorial Guinea. Limba speakers report some degree of mutual intelligibility and call it "Old Malimba".
