= Wovea people =

Cameroonian ethnic group

Wovea
Total population
- ~600 (1977)

Languages
- Wovea, Duala

Religion
- Christianity (especially Baptists); ancestor worship

Related ethnic groups
- Other Mbam peoples, (especially Bubis), Bakole, Bakweri, Bamboko, Duala, Isubu, Limba, Mungo

The Wovea are an ethnic group native to coastal areas of the Fako division of the Southwest Province of Cameroon. The Wovea are one of the ethnic groups that comprise the Sawa, or Cameroonian coastal peoples.

== History ==
Wovea oral history names a man from the island of Bioko as their forebear. His ship washed ashore at Mboko, the area southwest of Mount Cameroon. There he married a local woman. They moved southeast and settled at Ambas Bay. The Wovea likely lived along Ambas Bay in the 17th or 18th century. They could have participated in the same migration from Mboko that brought the Bakweri and Isubu to their current territories.

During the 16th and 17th centuries, the Wovea came under the dominance of the Isubu. When the Spanish ousted Protestant missionaries from their base at Fernando Po (modern Bioko) in 1858, the Isubu king, William I of Bimbia, sold part of Wovea territory to British missionary Alfred Saker. The area became Victoria (today known as Limbe). The Wovea living there were forced to move to Mondole Island. Victoria's population developed as a mixture of freed slaves, working Sawa, and Christianised Sawa from all the various coastal groups. Cameroonian Pidgin English began to develop at this time.

In 1905, under German colonial rule, the Wovea were relocated again to their present home west of the Wouri estuary. The Germans designated Mondole Island as a leper colony. After Germany's defeat in World War I, Wovea territory fell under a British League of Nations mandate.

== Geography and culture ==
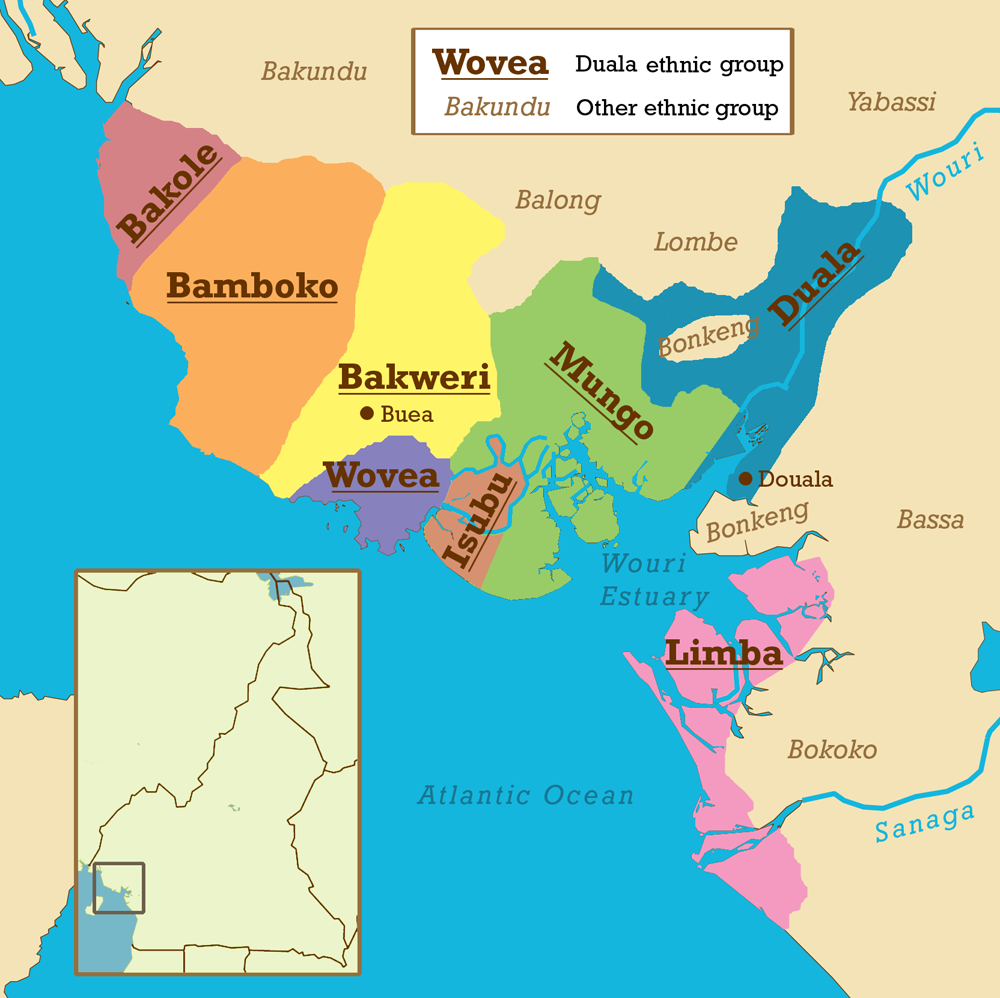
Map showing the location of the various Duala ethnic groups of Cameroon

The Wovea live south of Mount Cameroon and on the Gulf of Guinea, in the Fako division of the Southwest Province. Their territory lies directly west of that of the Isubu. Fishing is a major form of employment and subsistence.

Bobea is the Wovea language. The language had 600 speakers in 1977, although many Wovea speak Duala in lieu of their native tongue. In addition, most Wovea speak Cameroonian Pidgin English or standard English. A growing number of the Anglophones today grow up with Pidgin as their first tongue.

The Wovea have been mostly Christianized since the 1970s. Evangelical denominations dominate, particularly the Baptist church.

The Wovea participate in the Ngondo, a traditional festival of the Duala to which all of Cameroon's coastal Sawa peoples are invited. The main focus is on communicating with the ancestors and asking them for guidance and protection for the future. The festivities also include armed combat, beauty pageants, pirogue races, and traditional wrestling.

== Classification ==
The Wovea are Bantu in language and origin. More narrowly, they fall into the Sawa, or the coastal peoples of Cameroon.
