= Ruwa (deity) =

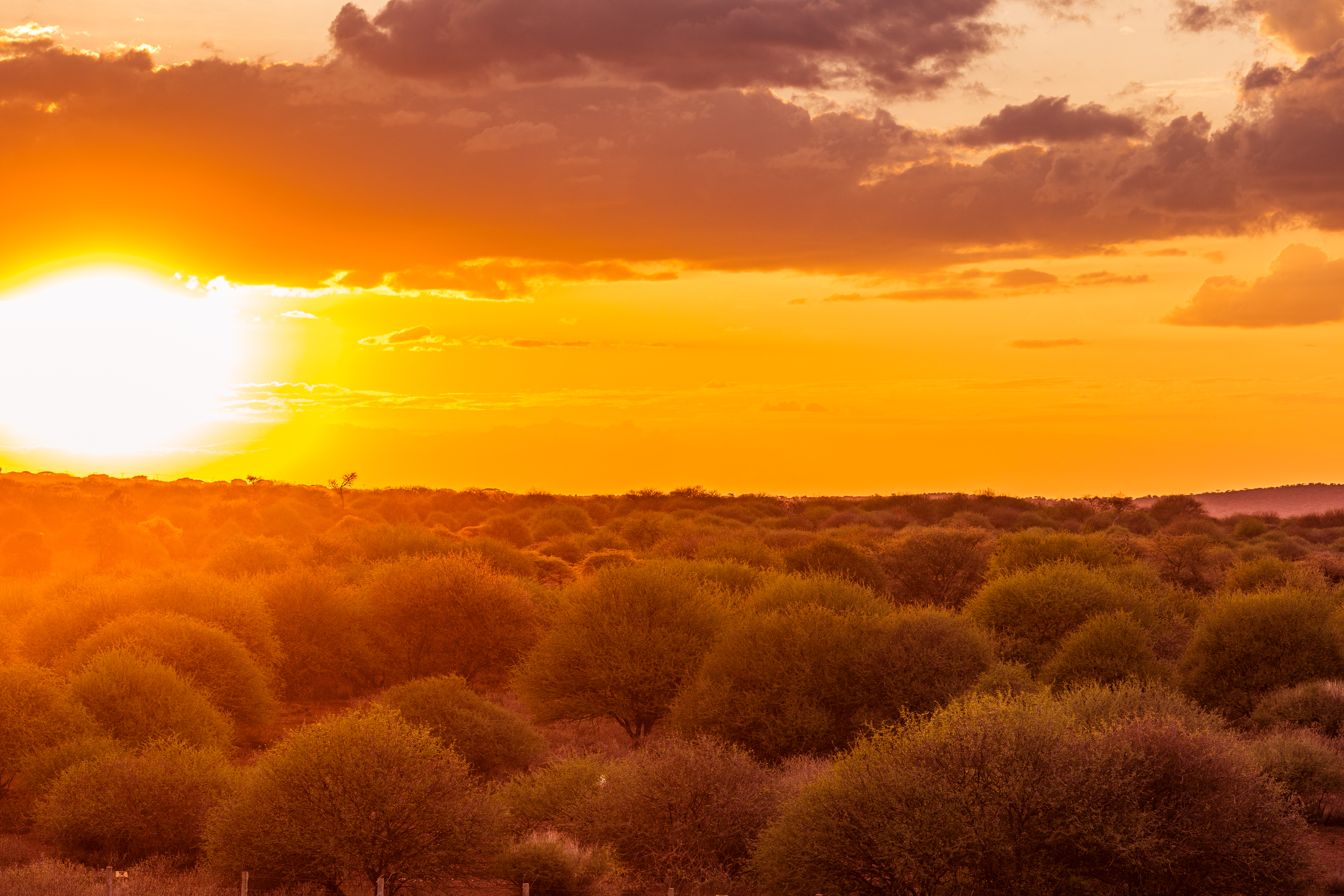
- The sun over Mount Killmanjaro
- Symbol: Sun
- Region: Kilimanjaro Region of Tanzania
- Ethnic group: Chaga people

Ruwa is the supreme god of the ancient Chagga religion of the Chagga people of Kilimanjaro, Tanzania. Ruwa is an omnipotent deity who exists outside of time and is the sustainer of the universe, who maintains universal harmony and is the final judge of peoples' fate. Ruwa is asssociated with the sun and his name means sun as well as Supreme Being/God.

== Overview ==
While superior spirits typically do not intervene directly in human affairs, Ruwa sends the spirits of the deceased, who inhabit the earth, to play a more active role in the lives of the living.

The two highest peaks of Tanzania's Mount Kilimanjaro, Kibo and Mawenzi, are Ruwa's wives.

== Names ==
Various names and descriptions are used to communicate Ruwa's various actions, including:

- Ruwa Moruwaruwa: God that sees everywhere and everything, nothing is hidden from Ruwa
- Ruwa Fumvu lya Mkuu: God is like an old and strong mountain, takes influence form Tanzania's Mount Kilimanjaro, refers to Ruwa's greatness and everlasting quality
- Ruwa Molunga Soka na Mndo: God can do even what seems impossible
- Ruwa Matengera: God who sustains all of creation

== Mythology ==
In the beginning of humanity, Ruwa freed mortals from the pot they were confined in, and gave them a garden full of food, but told them they could never eat the yam in the center. However, one day a stranger came who convinced the people that Ruwa had told him to cook and share the yam. When Ruwa found out that the people had fell for the trick and ate the forbidden yam, he made them mortal and vulnerable to disease.

== See also ==
- Fall of man (Christianity)
