= Sawabantu languages =

Language family

Sawabantu
- Linguistic classification: Niger–Congo?: Atlantic–Congo; Volta-Congo; Benue–Congo; Bantoid; Southern Bantoid; Bantu (Zone A); Sawabantu

Language codes
- Glottolog: sawa1251

The Sawabantu languages are a group of Bantu languages that are spoken in Cameroon, Equatorial Guinea and Gabon.

The group consists mostly of zones A.20 and A.30 of Guthrie's classification, and most likely also part of zone A.10. According to Nurse and Philipps on (2003), the A.20 and A.30 languages, apart from the Bubi language, form a valid node. The most important of these languages is Duala, which is a vehicular language.

== Etymology ==
The name Sawabantu is made up of two words: sawa, which means "coast" in Duala, and Bantu. The name was proposed in 1989 by the Cameroonian linguist Carl Ebobissé.

== Languages ==
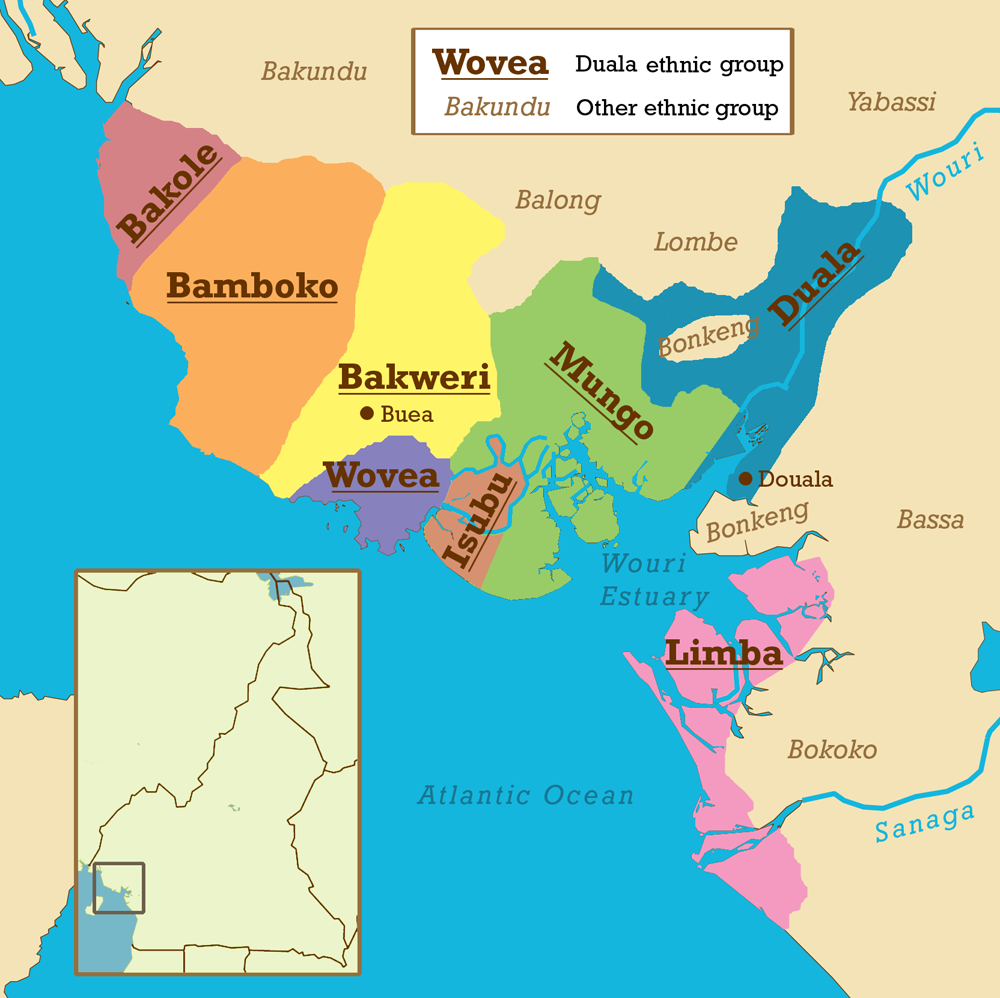
The A.20 languages

Besides the A.20 and A.30 languages, the Oroko dialect cluster of A.10 seems to be clearly connected to the Sawabantu group:

(A.10) Oroko; (A.20) Kpwe (Mokpwe, Bakweri)–Mboko (Bomboko, Wumboko)–Kole (Bakole), Duala (incl. Mungo dialect), Suwu (Isuwu/Isubu), Limba (Malimba); (A.30) Tanga (Batanga), Yasa–Kombe, Benga

The A.20 languages are spoken around the Wouri estuary and in the anglophone region around Mount Cameroon. The A.30 languages are spoken along the Atlantic coast of southern Cameroon down to northern Gabon. These two geographic groups are clearly related; for example, Limba (Malimba, A.26) report some degree of mutual intelligibility with Tanga (Batanga, A.32), which they call "Old Malimba". Oroko is spoken in Ndian and Meme departments in the Southwest Region of Cameroon. Oroko appears to be particularly close to Kpwe (A.22), with which mutual intelligibility might be possible to some extent.

The Bube language of Bioko Island (not to be confused with Bubia or Wovea) included in A.30 on geographic grounds, has no particular affinities with the others.

Other A.10 languages apart from the Manenguba cluster (A.15 excluding Bafaw-Balong) may also belong, but this is uncertain as they are poorly documented. They are:

Bonkeng and Bafaw-Balong, Nkongho

A survey is needed to determine whether these are genetically related to Sawabantu.

== Situation of Sawabantu ==
Duala is the vehicular language of the Sawa, spoken and understood throughout the coastal region, even by non-Sawabantu native speakers such as the Basaa of Douala, the Bakoko, the Bankon, and the Manenguba.
