= Qamata =

Creator god of the Xhosa

Qamata, also called Mdali or Thixo is the sole deity that is worshipped by the Xhosa people of Southeast Africa. Qamata is believed to be the benevolent creator of the heavens and earth, and is regarded as the supreme and omnipresent God.

== History and description ==
Qamata was originally called Mdali, but that name is not used as commonly anymore. Some believe that the name "Mdali" comes from the cave in the east he emerged from, called Daliwe ("creator"). Despite being referred to as "he", Qamata is described as neither male nor female. It is believed that Qamata does not have a physical form in the same way humans do.

MDALI (Music, Drama and Literature Institute) was also the name of a Johannesburg cultural organization during the 1980s.

== Mythology ==
Qamata is said to have created the first three humans, a man and two women, by splitting a reed. He then sent Nwabi, the chameleon, to tell the humans that they would live forever, but changed his mind and sent Ntulo, the much quicker salamander, to tell the humans that they would be mortal. Ntulo got to them first, which is why humans are not immortal.

== Worship ==
No sacrifices are made to Qamata, with the primary form of worship being prayer. He is frequently called upon during times of hardship or in exclamation (ie. Qamata ndincede, "Qamata help me").
