= Limba language (Cameroon) =

Bantu language spoken in Cameroon

Limba
- Malimba
- Native to: Cameroon
- Ethnicity: Limba
- Native speakers: (2,200 cited 2001)
- Language family: Niger–Congo?: Atlantic–Congo; Volta–Congo languages; Benue–Congo; Bantoid; Southern Bantoid; Bantu; Zone A; Sawabantu; Duala–Limba; Limba

Language codes
- ISO 639-3: mzd
- Glottolog: mali1280
- Guthrie code: A.27

Limba (Malimba, Mulimba) is a Bantu language of Cameroon. It is very closely related to Duala. Speakers report some degree of mutual intelligibility with Tanga (Batanga), which they call "Old Malimba". Most speak Duala as the local lingua franca.
