= Bakoko people =

Ethnic group in Cameroon

The Bakoko, also known as the Basoo, are a Bantu ethnic group in Cameroon. According to 2010 figures there are around 111,000 of them, mostly concentrated in the Littoral Region in the southwest of the country. They speak the Bakoko language and are related to the Bassa people. These people put up a resistance to the Germans when they invaded in 1889.
