= Limba people (Cameroon) =

Limba People
Total population
- Total: 2,230 (2001)

Regions with significant populations
- Cameroon

Languages
- Duala languages (Bakole, Bubea, Duala, Isu, Limba, Mokpwe, Wumboko)

Religion
- Predominantly Christian and/or ancestor worshippers

Related ethnic groups
- Bakole, Bakweri, Bamboko, Duala, Isubu, Mungo, Wovea

The Mulimba (or Malimba) are an ethnic group of the Republic of Cameroon. They belong to the Sawa peoples, those of the Cameroonian coast.

== History and geography ==
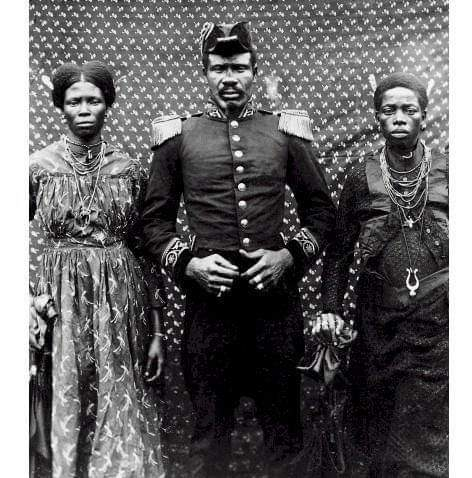
Moukoko Manyanye "King Pass All" Roi des Malimba (1884)

Mulimba and Duala oral history traces their ancestry back to a man named Mbedi. His sons, Ewale and Dibongo, parted from a place called Piti on the Dibamba River. Ewale moved to the mouth of the Dibamba with his followers and then northwest to the east bank of Wouri River estuary. Meanwhile, Dibongo and his companions migrated southeast to the Sanaga River and then split up, some heading upstream with Dibongo and others moving downstream with a man named Ilimbe. Ewale's people became the Duala, and Dibongo's the ILimb'a Mbed'a Mbongo. Limba territory lies southeast of the Duala, east of the Wouri estuary, to the mouth of the Sanaga River, and up its course to Edéa in the Sanaga-Maritime division of the Littoral Province. Fishing is an important part of the diet.

The Limba emerged as prominent traders during the 16th and 17th centuries. The Limba purchased goods and slaves from interior groups and sold these items to the Europeans, typically aboard their ships (and later at mainland factories or stores). In exchange, the Europeans provided alcohol, gunpowder, guns, mirrors, shoes, textiles, and tools. When the Limba king, Pass All, ceded his territories to the French, British traders expressed the urgency of annexing the Duala territories north of there. In July 1884, however, German explorer Gustav Nachtigal annexed all of Cameroon for the German Empire.

== Culture ==
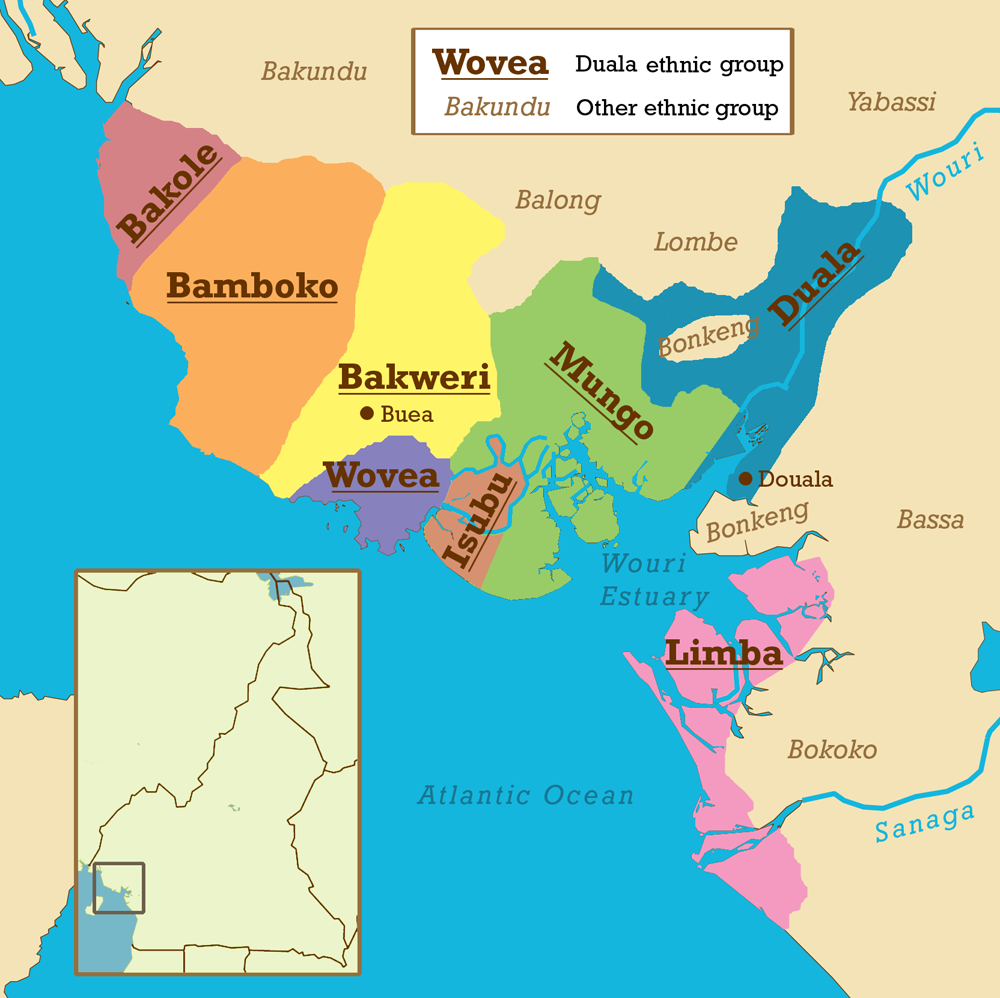
Map showing the location of the various Duala ethnic groups of Cameroon

Malimba is part of the Bantu group of the Niger–Congo language family. Malimba speakers have little difficulty understanding Duala. The Limba often utilise Duala and Mokpwe as trade languages, due largely to the spread of these tongues by early missionaries. In addition, individuals who have attended school or lived in an urban centre usually speak French.

The Limba participate in the annual Ngondo, a traditional festival for all of Cameroon's coastal peoples, during which participants communicate with the ancestors and ask them for guidance and protection for the future. The festivities also include armed combat, beauty pageants, pirogue races, and traditional wrestling. The Mpo'o brings together the Bakoko, Bakweri, and Limba at Edéa. The festival commemorates the ancestors and allows the participants to consider the problems facing the Duala and humanity as a whole. Lively music, dancing, theatre, and recitals accompany the celebration.
