= Oroko language =

Bantu dialect cluster spoken in Cameroon

Oroko
- Balondo
- Native to: Cameroon
- Region: Southwest and Kribi
- Native speakers: (110,000 cited 2000)
- Language family: Niger–Congo?: Atlantic–Congo; Benue–Congo; Bantoid; Bantu (Zone A); Sawabantu (A.10); Oroko
- Dialects: Kundu; Lue; Mbonge; Ekombe; Londo ba Nanga; Londo ba Diko; Ngolo; Bima; Tanga or Batanga; Koko
- Writing system: Latin

Language codes
- ISO 639-3: bdu
- Glottolog: orok1266
- Guthrie code: A.101 (ex-A.11,12)

Male Oroko Dancers at the Southwest Festival of Culture

Oroko, also Bakundu-Balue or Balundu-Bima, is a group of Bantu languages spoken in Cameroon.

Varieties are Kundu/Nkundu (Lokundu, Bakundu), Lue (Lolue, Balue), Mbonge, Ekombe, Londo (Londo ba Nanga; cf. Londo), Londo ba Diko, Ngolo (Longolo; cf. Ngolo dialect), Bima, Tanga (Lotanga, Batanga), and Koko (Lokoko, Bakoko: distinct from Bakoko language). Maho (2009) treats these as ten distinct languages.

== Phonology ==
=== Consonants ===
		Bilabial	Labio- dental	Alveolar	Post-alv./ Palatal	Velar		Labial- velar
		Bilabial	Labio- dental	Alveolar	Post-alv./ Palatal	plain	lab.	Labial- velar
Nasal		m		n	ɲ	ŋ		
Plosive/ Affricate	voiceless	p		t	t͡ʃ	k	kʷ (Note: is heard in the dialects of Londo, Lokundu, Longolo, Lokoko, Lotanga.)	k͡p
Plosive/ Affricate	voiced	b		d	d͡ʒ		ɡʷ	
Plosive/ Affricate	prenasal	ᵐb		ⁿd	ᶮd͡ʒ	ᵑɡ	ᵑɡʷ (Note: is heard in the Lotanga dialect.)	ᵑᵐɡ͡b
Fricative	voiceless	ɸ (Note: is a realization of /f/ across dialects.)	f	s				
Fricative	voiced/pren.	β (Note: is a realization of /b/ across dialects.)	ᶬf, ᶬv (Note: is heard in the Longolo dialect.)					
Fricative	prenasal		ⁿf (Note: is heard in the Lokoko dialect.), ⁿv (Note: is heard in the Bima and Londo dialects.)					
Liquid				l ~ r				
Approximant					j			w

- [r] is used interchangeably with /l/ among speakers.

=== Vowels ===
	Front	Central	Back
Close	i		u
Close-mid	e		o
Open-mid	ɛ		ɔ
Open		a	

== Writing system ==
Oroko alphabet
a	b	c	ɗ	e	ɛ	f	i	j	k	kp	m	mb	n	nd	ng	ngb	nj	ny	ŋ	o	ɔ	s	t	u	w	y
