= Kpwe language =

Bantu language spoken in Cameroon

Kpwe
- Mokpwe
- Native to: Cameroon
- Ethnicity: Kpwe, Mboko
- Native speakers: (25,000 cited 2000–2014)
- Language family: Niger–Congo?: Atlantic–Congo; Benue–Congo; Bantoid; Bantu (Zone A); Sawabantu (A.20); Kpwe
- Dialects: Kole; Mboko

Language codes
- ISO 639-3: Variously: bri – Kpwe bqm – Mboko (Wumboko) kme – Kole (Bakole)
- Glottolog: mokp1239 Mokpwe wumb1241 Wumboko bako1250 Bakole
- Guthrie code: A.21,22,231
- ELP: Bakole

- People: Bekpak
- Language: Rikpa

Kpwe (Mokpwe) is a Bantu language of Cameroon. It is mutually intelligible with Kole, and probably with Mboko (Wumboko) as well.

There are multiple variants of the name: based on 'Kpwe' (Bakpwe, Mokpwe), on 'Kpe' (Mokpe), on 'Kweɾi' (Kwedi, Kweli, Kwili, Kwiri, Bakwedi, Bakwele, Bakweri, Vakweli, Bekwiri), as well as Ujuwa and Vambeng.

== Phonology ==
The Kpwe phonological inventory is as follows,

=== Vowels ===
	Front	Back
Close	i	u
Close-mid	e	o
Open-mid	ɛ	ɔ
Open	a	

=== Consonants ===
		Bilabial	Coronal	Palatal	Velar	Labiovelar
Nasal		m	n	ɲ		ŋʷ · ŋm
Plosive	prenasal	ᵐb	ⁿd	ᶮdʒ	ᵑɡ	ᵑɡb
Plosive	voiced	(b)		dʒ	(ɡ)	ɡb
Plosive	voiceless	(p)	t		k	kp
Fricative	voiceless	ɸ				
Fricative	voiced	β				
Rhotic			zr^{§}			
Lateral			l			
Approximant				j		w

^{§}/zr/, the 'liquidized alveolar fricative', may be realized as [zr], [ʒr], [rz] or [rʒ]. This sound is rendered /s/ in some sources, and is cognate to /s/ in Bubia.

/p/ and /ɡ/ in parentheses are only found in loans, while /b/ is very uncommon and in many inflections freely alternates as [w].

=== Tone ===
Kpwe contrasts five tones on short syllables: high, downstepped high, low, rising and falling.

== Literature ==
The first portions of the Bible were made available in Mokpwe in 2009. This was followed by the New Testament, translated with help from the Bakweri Language and Literacy Association, (BALALIA) on 29 March 2025. The New Testament is available online, in places such as YouVersion.
