= Cameroonian Pidgin English =

English-based creole of Cameroon

Cameroon Pidgin English
- Kamtok
- Wes Cos
- Native to: Cameroon
- Region: Northwest Region, Southwest Region, littoral Region
- Speakers: 12 million (2017)
- Language family: English Creole: Atlantic; West African Pidgin English; Cameroon Pidgin English
- Dialects: Grafi; Liturgical; Francophone; Limbe; Bororo

Language codes
- ISO 639-3: wes
- Glottolog: came1254
- Linguasphere: 52-ABB-bg
- Distribution of Kamtok

Cameroonian Pidgin English, or Cameroonian Creole (Cameroon Pidgin: Wes Cos, from West Coast), is a language variety of Cameroon also known as Kamtok (from 'Cameroon-talk') which, like other varieties of West African Pidgin English originated as a language of contact between colonizing British and African slave traders for the transatlantic slave trade. It is primarily spoken in the North West and South West English speaking regions. Cameroonian Pidgin English is an English-based creole language. Approximately 5% of Cameroonians are native speakers of the language, while an estimated 50% of the population speak it in some form.

The terms "Cameroonian Pidgin", "Cameroonian Pidgin English", "Cameroonian Creole", and "Kamtok" are synonyms for what Cameroonians call Cameroon Pidgin English. Several speakers of Cameroonian pidgin refer to Standard English as "Grammar", and recognize the difference between the two. It is a variety of West African English Pidgins spoken along the coast from Ghana to Cameroon. It is a vehicular language that has been in active use in the country for over 200 years. It came into being in the Slave Trade Years (1440 to early 1800s). It preceded English in Cameroon: the first Baptist missionaries who arrived in Cameroon in 1845 and introduced formal education in English, had to learn Pidgin. A few decades later during the German annexation period (1884–1914), pidgin resisted a German ban. It took flight when it became a makeshift language used in German plantations and undertakings by forced labourers who were drawn from the hinterland and who spoke different indigenous languages. With time it passed into use in the market place, and was adopted by Baptist missionaries as the language of their evangelical crusade. For many years, it has been used on school playgrounds and campuses and in political campaigns, and today it is forcing its way into spoken media.

== Varieties ==
Five varieties of Cameroonian Pidgin English are currently recognised:

- Grafi Kamtok, the variety used in the grassfields and often referred to as 'Grafi Talk'.
- Liturgical Kamtok, the variety has been used by the Catholic Church for three-quarters of a century.
- Francophone Kamtok, the variety is now used mainly in towns such as Douala, Nkongsamba, Bafoussam, and Yaoundé, and by francophones talking to anglophones who do not speak French.
- Limbe Kamtok, the variety is spoken mainly in the southwest coastal area around the port that used to be called Victoria and is now Limbe.
- Bororo Kamtok, the variety is spoken by the Bororo cattle traders, many of whom travel through Nigeria and Cameroon.

== Phonology ==
=== Vowels ===
Like most West African languages, Kamtok has seven vowels, with two mid vowels: open and closed (Schneider 1966:14–17). Schneider spells the mid vowels as closed ey and ow vs. open e and o but Todd spells them as closed e and o vs. open eh and oh.

| | Front | Central | Back |
|---|---|---|---|
| Close | i | | u |
| Close-mid | e | | o |
| Open-mid | ɛ | | ɔ |
| Open | | a | |

=== Consonants ===
The palatal approximate /j/ is written y, the palatal affricates /t͡ʃ/ and /d͡ʒ/ are written ch and j, and the palatal and velar nasals /ɲ/ and /ŋ/ are written ny and ng (Schneider 1966:12–14). Some of these consonants, such as /r/ and /l/, are not distinguished by speakers who lack such distinctions in their local substrate languages (1966:225–229).

| | Labial | Coronal | Palatal | Velar | Glottal |
|---|---|---|---|---|---|
| Plosive | p b | t d | t͡ʃ d͡ʒ | k ɡ | |
| Fricative | f | s | ʃ | | h |
| Nasal | m | n | ɲ | ŋ | |
| Lateral | | l | | | |
| Approximant | w | | j | | |
| Rhotic | | r | | | |

- Where symbols appear in pairs the one to the left represents a voiceless consonant.

== Word classes ==
=== Pronoun system ===
The basic pronoun system of Kamtok distinguishes three persons and two numbers. In most cases, the shape of the pronoun does not change to show grammatical function. Two exceptions involve the first person singular, where a serves as a subject clitic on verbs, as in mi, a mos go 'I must go', and ma is the possessive pronoun, as in ma bele 'my stomach'. The other major exception is -am in place of i or dem as an object suffix on verbs, except when the referent is human, as in a go was-am 'I'll wash it'. (Schneider 1966:64–68). Acrolectal speakers, however, are more likely to use dei for dem in subject position and ohs for wi in object position (Todd, n.d.).

| Person | Singular | Plural |
|---|---|---|
| 1st | mi, a, ma | wi |
| 2nd | yu | (w)una |
| 3rd | i, -am | dem, -am |

=== Verbs ===
Verbs are not inflected to show grammatical tense, aspect, modality, or negation. Instead, these notions are conveyed by a small set of preverbal auxiliaries (Schneider 1966:69–72, 95–104).

- no – 'not'
- neba, neva – 'never'
- bin, bi – past tense
- go – future tense
- don, dong – perfective aspect
- di – progressive aspect
- fit – 'can, able to'
- lak – 'must, like'
- mos – 'must, ought to'
- wan – 'want to'
- look – 'look, watch'
- sabi – 'to know'
- tchop – 'to eat'
- waka – 'to walk or to function properly'

Examples:

- Tiri pipo go di kam. 'Three people will be coming.'
- Ma masa bin tutu wok. 'My boss worked very hard.'
- Dem neva cam? 'They haven't come yet?'
- Yu no fit bi ma klak. 'You cannot be my clerk.'
- The Pipo go go small time. 'The people will go soon.'
- The Pastor di soso tok. 'The pastor was continually talking.'
- Ah no wan look dat kain ting. 'I don't want to watch that kind of thing.'
- If yu torcham, e go chuk yu. 'If you touch it, it will poke you.'
- Which man don tif ma book(s) dem? 'Who has stolen my books?'
- Wi get plenti de go learnam komot dem. 'We have much to learn from them.'

The rendition of a short passage from English to Cameroon Pidgin:

English language:

The boy who came yesterday was annoyed that he was not accepted. After a quarrel with me, he went off sorry for himself. We were later told that he told our boss that he was rejected because I hated him. The boss later called me to his office and questioned me about the reasons I refused to take in the boy in question and I told him. Tanga (the boy) was noted as a notorious thief and he is a mischief in the community.

Cameroon Pidgin:

The boy whe cam yesterday be vex say them no gri yi. After whe yi quarrel with me, e comot go, sorry sorry. After them be tell we say e go tell wah boss say we no take yi because i hate yi. Wa boss bin call me for yi office, and question me for know the reason why i no take the boy. I tell yi the truth. That boy Tanga na tif man and no some very bad boy for quarter.

=== Plural markers ===
In pidgin unlike in English, -s is not used at the end of nouns to mark their plural state. Instead, this is what is used:

- 'dem' or 'ndem' e.g.: The boy dem di cam – The boys are coming.

== Sources ==
- Todd, Loreto, with Martin Jumbam and Herbert Wamey. n.d. Language Varieties: Kamtok (Cameroon Pidgin), University of New England (Australia) School of Languages, Cultures and Linguistics.
- Schneider, G. D. 1966. West African Pidgin English: A Descriptive Linguistic Analysis with Texts and Glossary from the Cameroon Area. Ph.D. thesis, Hartford Seminary. Athens, Ohio: Self-published.

== Bibliography ==
- Ayafor, Miriam and Melanie Green (2017). Cameroon Pidgin English: a comprehensive grammar. London Oriental and African Language Library 20. Amsterdam: John Benjamins. ISBN 9789027266033
- de Féral, Carole : Pidgin-English du Cameroun. Description linguistique et sociolinguistique. Peeters/Selaf, Paris, France 1989, ISBN 2-87723-023-6.
- Kouega, Jean-Paul (2001). Pidgin facing death in Cameroon. Terralingua.
- Kouega, Jean-Paul (2007). The language situation in Cameroon. Current Issues in Language Planning (CILP), 8(1), 1–94.
- Kouega, Jean-Paul (2008). A Dictionary of Cameroon Pidgin English Usage: Pronunciation, Grammar and Vocabulary. Muenchen, Germany: Lincom Europa. ISBN 978-3-89586-204-5
- Wolf, Hans-Georg (2001): English in Cameroon. Contributions to the Sociology of Language, Volume 85. Walter de Gruyter, Berlin, Germany, ISBN 3-11-017053-1.
