= King Bell (disambiguation) =

King Bell may refer to several Cameroonian rulers:

- Henri Lobe Bell
- Ndumbe Lobe Bell
- Manga Ndumbe Bell (1838–1898)
- Rudolf Duala Manga Bell (1873–1914)
- Richard Ndumbe Manga Bell
- Alexandre Douala Manga Bell (1897–1966)
