= Palace of King Bell =

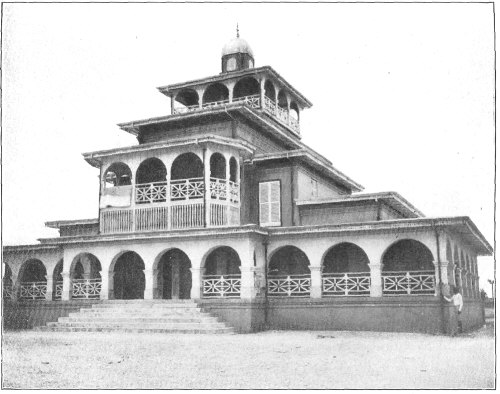
- Interactive map of the Palace of King Bell area

General information
- Type: Palace
- Architectural style: Eclectic
- Location: Douala, Cameroon
- Coordinates: 4.04339°N 9.68713°E
- Current tenants: A restaurant and espace doual'art
- Construction started: 1905
- Completed: 1905
- Client: The German government for King Auguste Manga Ndumbe (King Bell)
- Owner: Family Bell

The Palace of King Bell situated in Douala is a building constructed in 1905 by the Germans for King Auguste Manga Ndumbe (King Bell). The building is also known as La Pagode; this name comes from the French writer Louis-Ferdinand Céline, who stayed in Douala in 1916–17, and who called it such in his famous novel Voyage au bout de la nuit (Journey to the End of the Night).

== History ==
Ascending to the throne in 1897, Auguste Manga Ndumbe created a large plantation of cocoa and palm oil in Mungo on banks of the estuary of the Kamerun-Wui river, so as to compensate for the decline of the Douala economy based on the trade monopoly with the hinterland. He also carried out significant real estate investments in Bonanjo. At that time, the fortune of Auguste Manga exceeded by far that of his contemporaries and those of Akwa, Deïdo, and Bonabéri. He only lived in this residence for three years, dying in 1908. His son and heir Rudolph Douala Manga Bell reigned from 1908 to 1914, with his wife Emma Engomè Dayas. She was the daughter of British Captain Dayas and a young woman from Bali, Tébédi Eyoum. They lived here until the German authorities jailed Rudolph and hanged him on 8 August 1914. Alexandre Douala Manga Bell, son of the late Rudolph, celebrated as a hero and martyr, chose to live in Bali rather than this mansion. Known today as Le Parc des Princes, this compound includes the Bell's Chefferie. Since 1920, the old mansion has been occupied by a long list of inhabitants and is still owned by the Bell royal family. Because of its history and its architecture, this building has always been an icon in Douala.

In 2006 the building was highlighted by a sign produced by doual'art and designed by Sandrine Dole; the sign presented an historical image of the building and a description of its history.

== Gallery ==
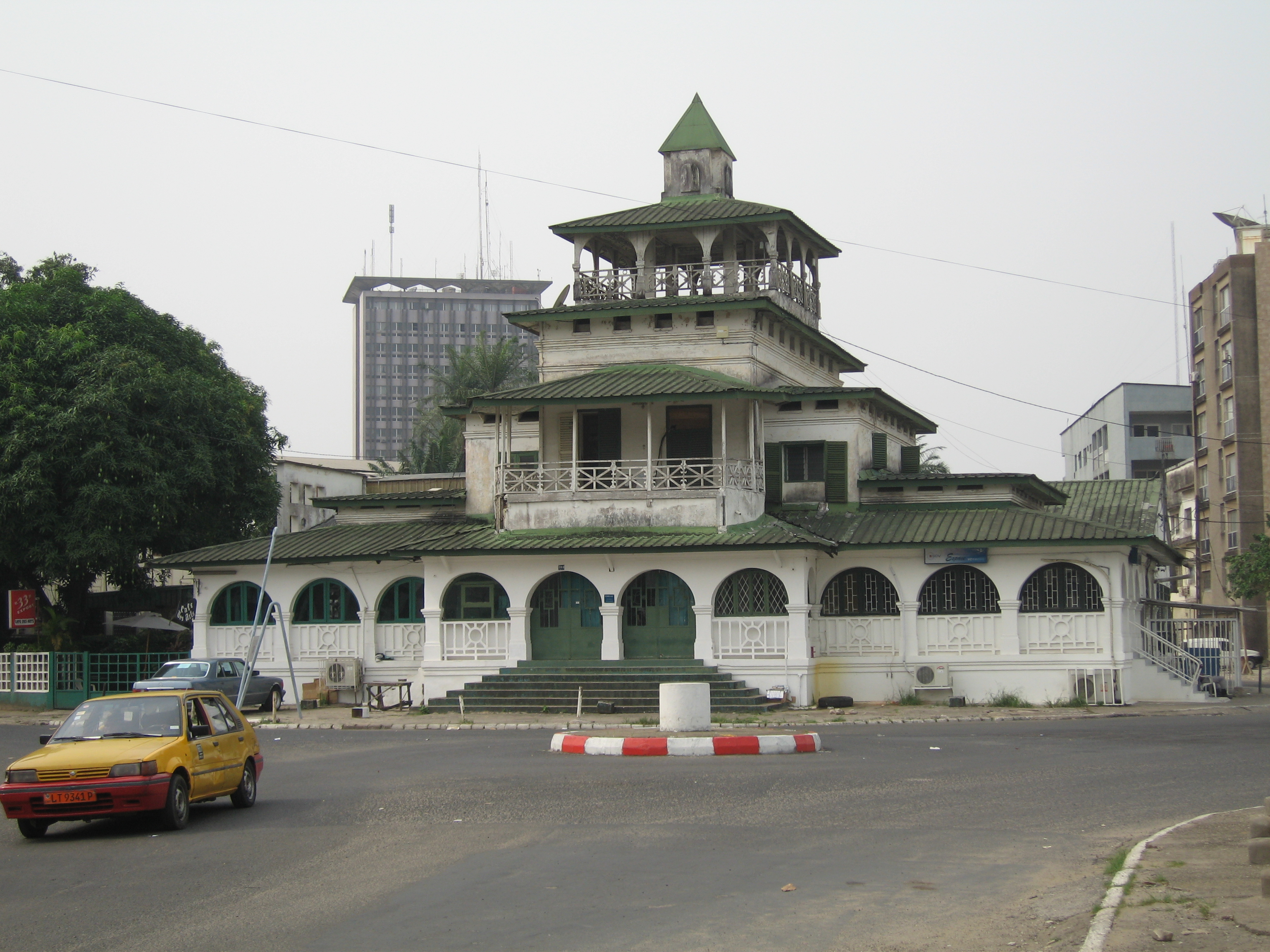
Photp by Emiliano Gandolfi, 2007.

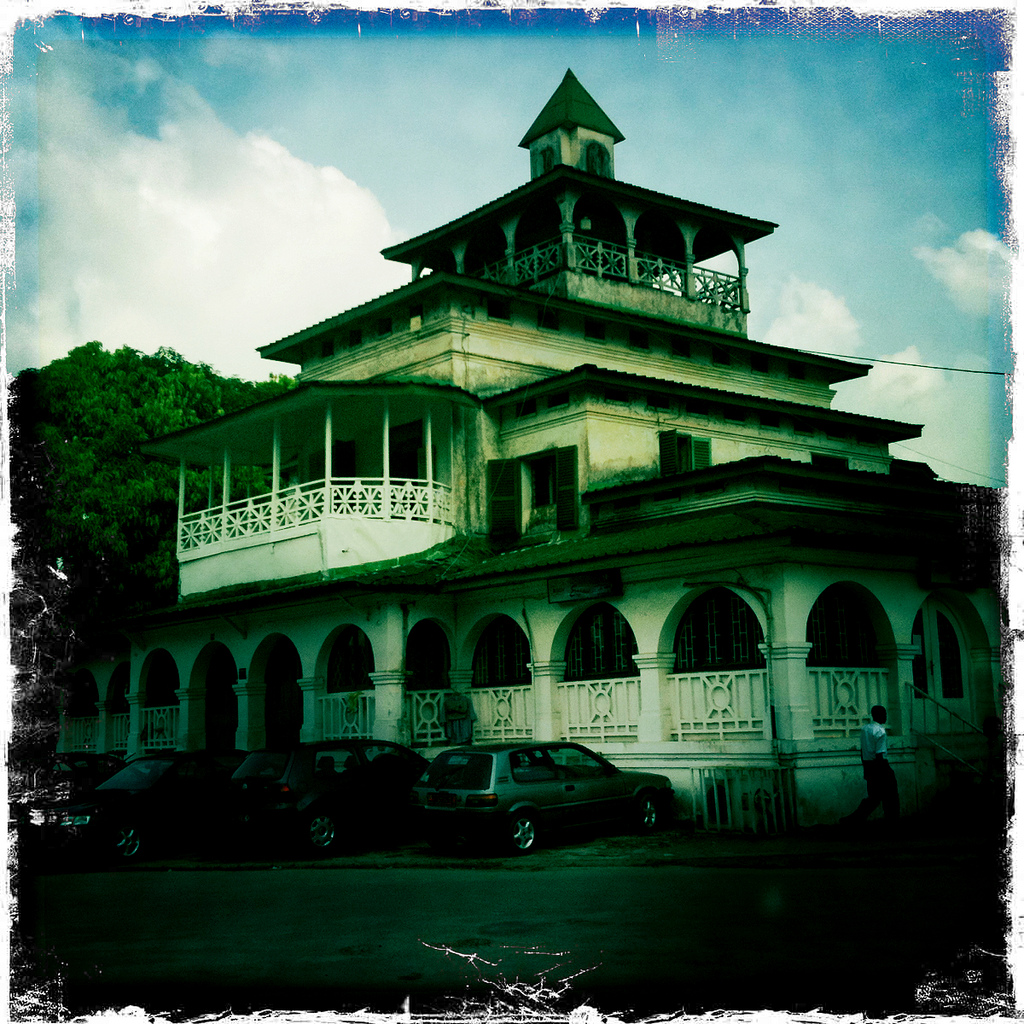
Photo by Roberto Paci Dalò, 2010.

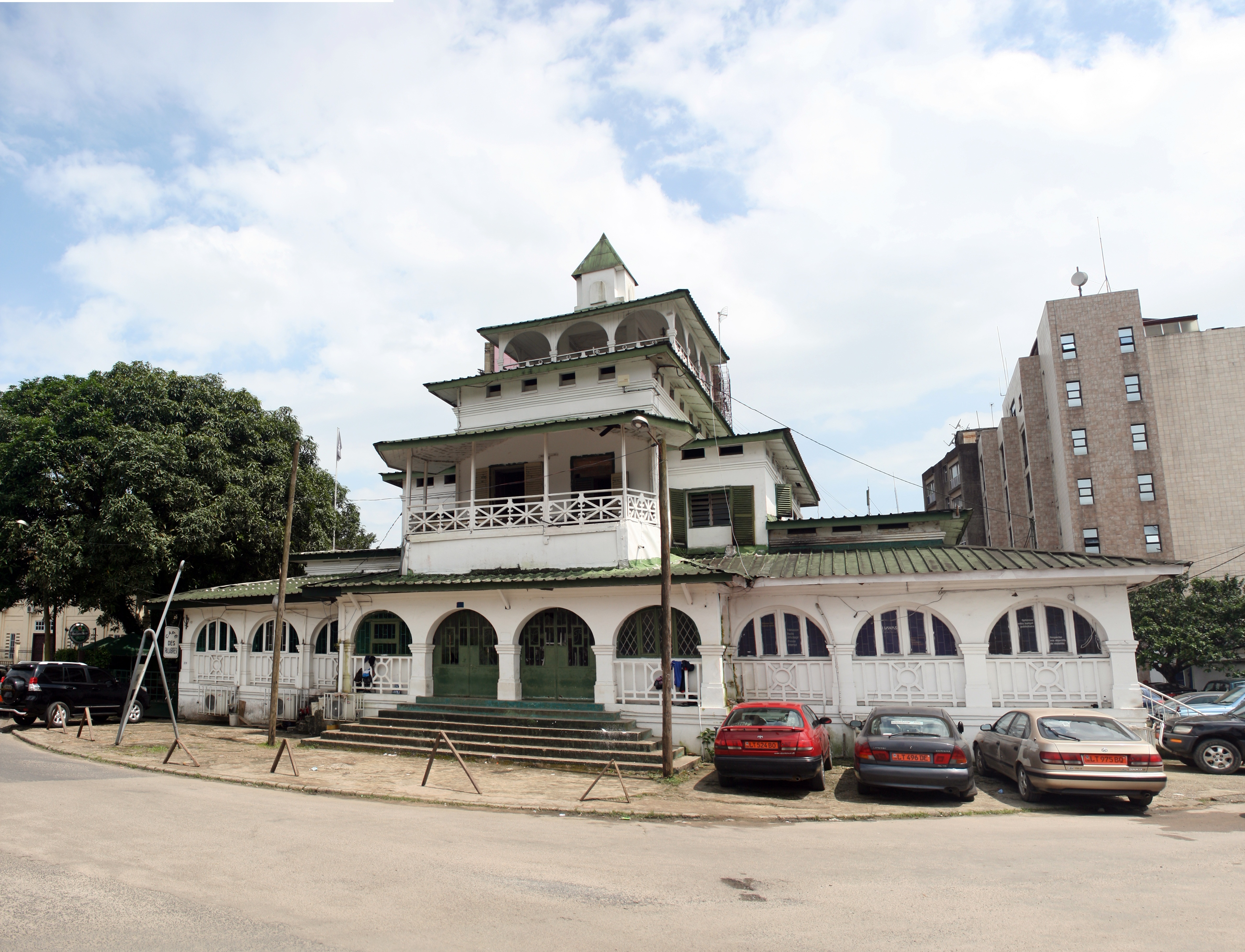

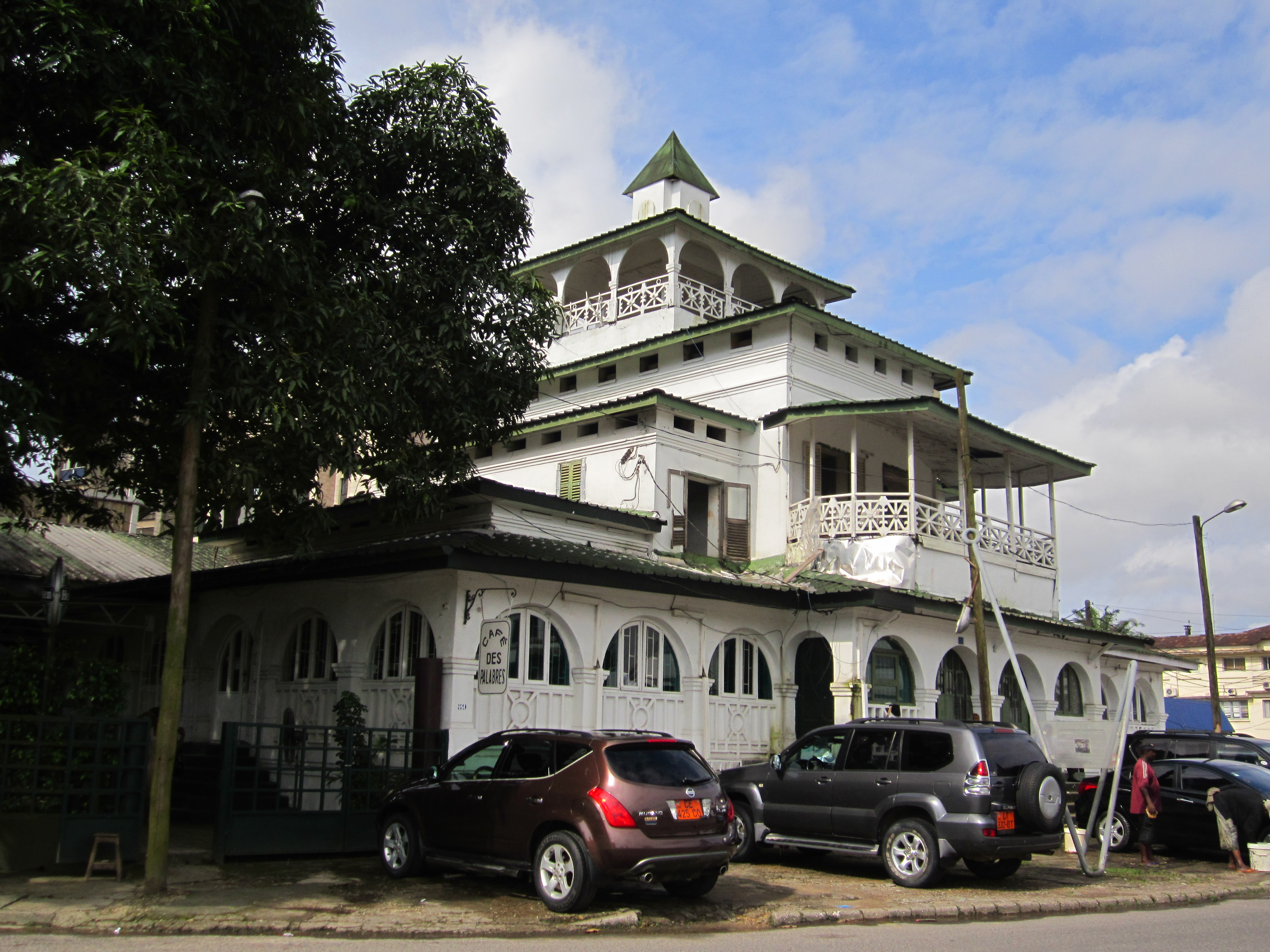

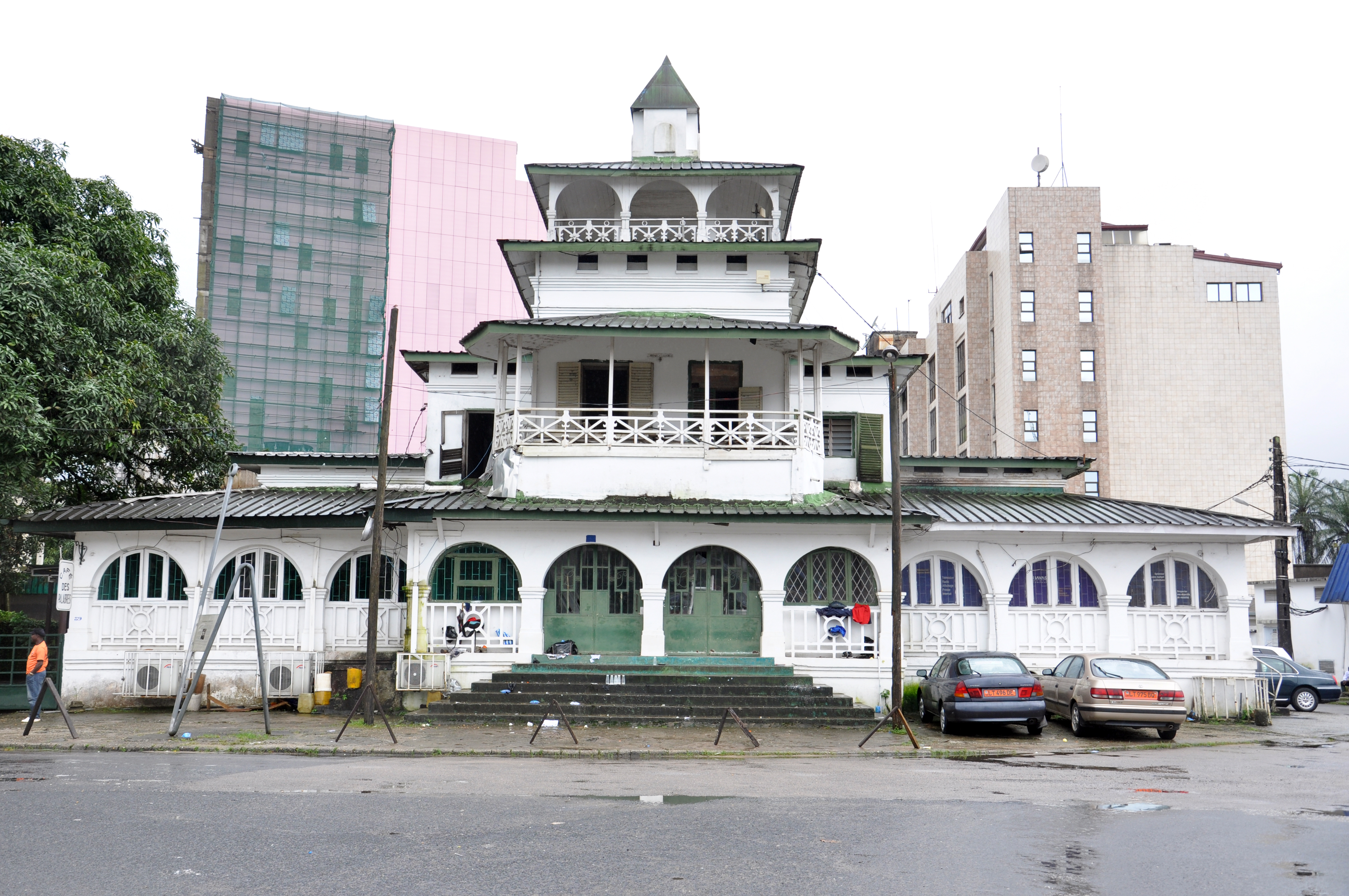

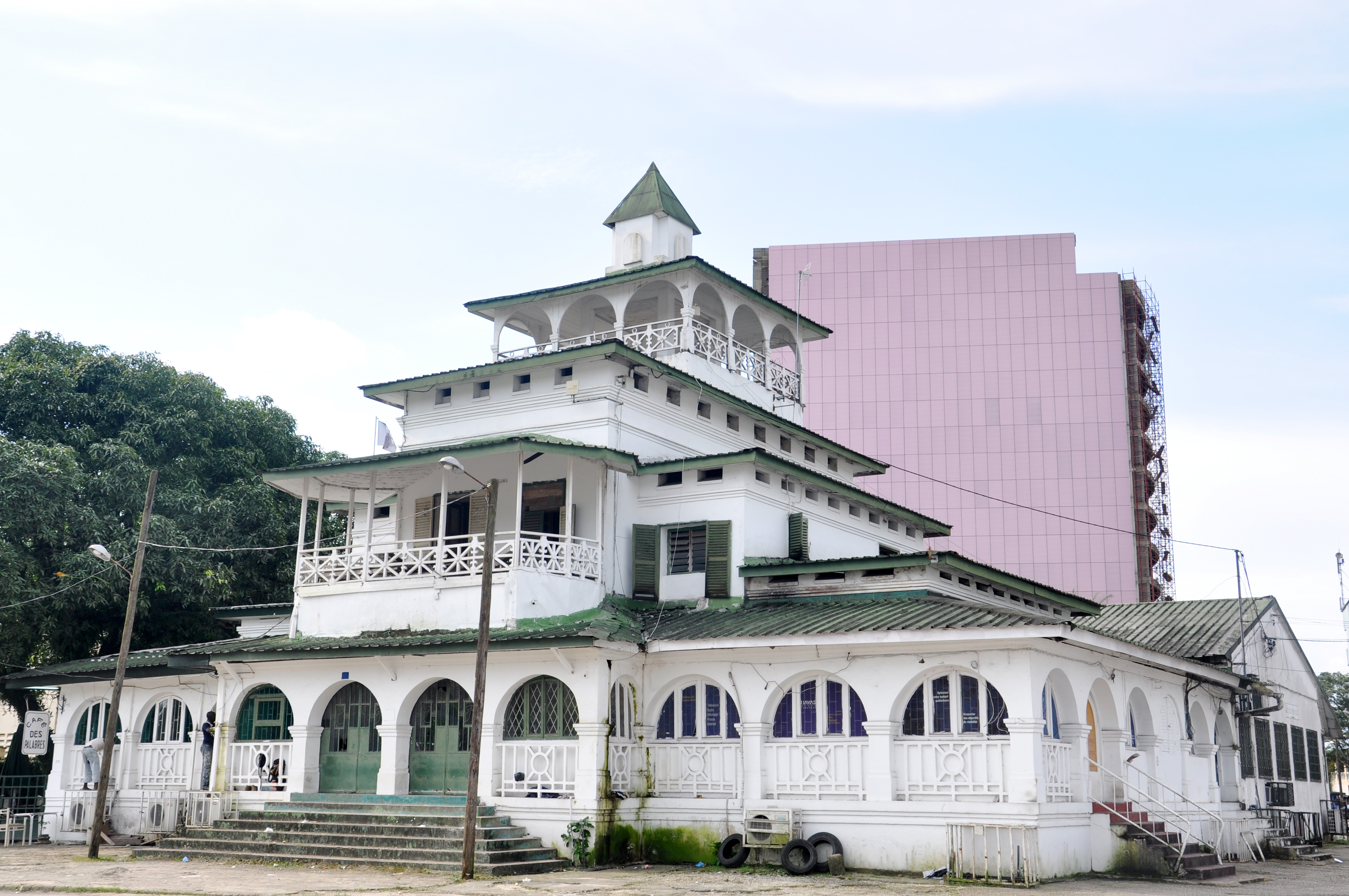

== See also ==
- Kamerun
