= David Meetom =

Government interpreter in German Cameroon

David Meetom (Note: sometimes spelled Metom, Meton, Mitom, Meatom) (Duala name Ngando Mwange; c. 1850s – 1894) was a sub-chief of the Duala and one of the most important interpreters and mediators in the coastal region of Cameroon at the beginning of German colonial rule in the area.

== Early life and education ==
David Meetom was presumably born in the 1850s. He attended a missionary school and later worked as a missionary teacher for the English Baptist Mission.

Meetom was an Akwa subchief from Bonakwamwang on the left bank of the river Wouri. As a merchant, he was involved in cocoa production in Duala. He was one of the Duala representatives who signed the treaty on 12 July 1884, which became the legal basis of German colonial rule in Cameroon.

His son, Tube Meetom, was sent to Aalen in Germany together with the grandson of King Bell, Rudolf Doula Manga Bell, to be educated there.

== Role as government interpreter and death ==
After Germany took over the colony of Cameroon, Meetom became one of the main intermediaries between the German authorities and the coastal population, not least because of his command of the English language. He soon played an important role in the dealings between German officials and African authorities, establishing contacts, interpreting and guiding negotiations. Meetom developed a close relationship with the governor Julius von Soden who officially appointed him government interpreter in 1885.

In April 1894, several allegations were made to the colonial authorities that Meetom was abusing his position as an interpreter and negotiator. The colonial government initiated an investigation and convicted Meetom of various abuses of his power. Because of his influence, he was exiled to the German colony Togo rather than imprisoned in Cameroon. He was put on a steamer from which he escaped in July 1894 during a stopover at Victoria (now Limbé). He returned to Duala and attempted to flee further inland with his wives and children. The colonial government confiscated his property, declared him an outlaw and Meetom was eventually shot dead that year.
