= Ndumbe =

Ndumbe is a given name. It may refer to the following people:

- Ndumbe Lobe Bell (1839–1897) a leader of the Duala people in Southern Cameroon
- Ndumbe Eyoh (1949–2006), a Cameroonian theatre director, critic, and playwright
- Manga Ndumbe Bell (1851–1908), a leader of the Duala people of southern Cameroon
