= Eugen von Zimmerer =

German attorney and governor

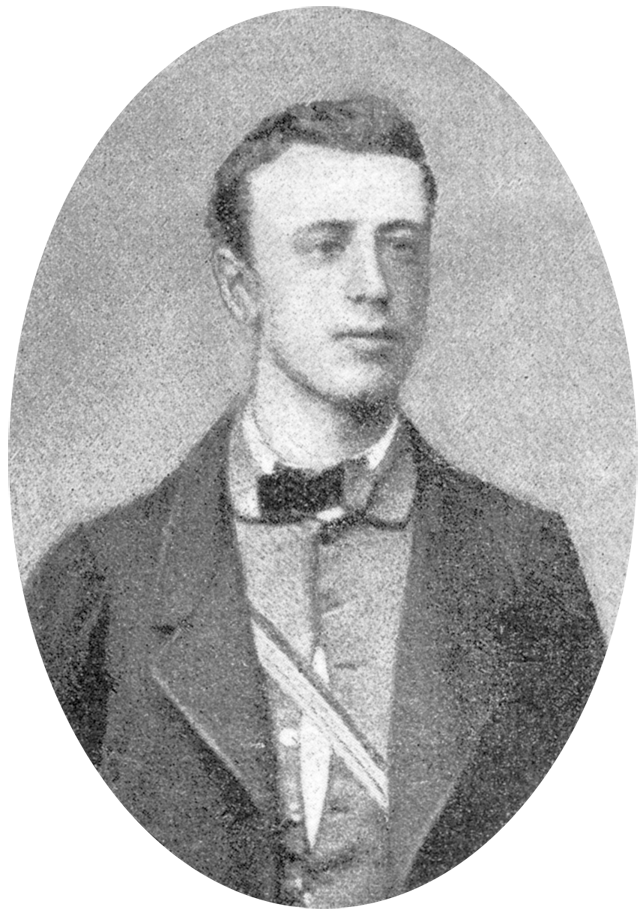
Eugen Zimmerer as a student in Würzburg in 1862

Eugen Ritter von Zimmerer (24 November 1843 – 10 March 1918) was an attorney, prosecutor and judge in Bavaria before he entered the colonial service in 1887 when he was in his 40s. He served in German colonies of Kamerun and Togo before being appointed as governor of Kamerun, serving between 1890 and 1893. Following that, Zimmerer was assigned to posts in Brazil, Chile and Haiti before retiring and returning to Germany.

== Early life, education and career ==
Eugen Ritter von Zimmerer was born on 24 November 1843 in Germersheim, the son of a Bavarian officer and his wife. He attended high school in Bayreuth. From 1861 he studied law at the universities of Würzburg and Heidelberg. While in Würzburg, he was a member of the Corps Bavaria Würzburg, the oldest of German student associations.

Zimmerer began his legal career as an assistant in the District Court in Bayreuth. He held the positions of public prosecutor at the District Court of Straubing (1874), District Court Judge in Starnberg (1876), State Prosecutor at the district court in Bayreuth (1878), State Prosecutor at the Regional Court of Munich (1879), and Judge of the Regional Court of Munich (1886).

== West Africa ==
At the age of 44, Zimmerer joined the colonial service in 1887, at a time when Germany was expanding its holdings in Africa. He was appointed acting chancellor and deputy governor of Kamerun. The Governor of the colony, Julius Freiherr von Soden, posted him to relieve the exploratory expedition of Captain Richard Kund. In October 1888 Zimmerer was appointed imperial commissioner for Togo. While in Togo, Zimmerer became friendly with Manga Ndumbe Bell, the son and heir of King Ndumbe Lobe Bell of the Duala people of Kamerun. Manga had been exiled to Togo by Freiherr von Soden on the grounds of being a "bad influence".

In 1890 Zimmerer returned to Kamerun as acting governor, and in April 1891 was appointed governor. Zimmerer was more concerned with consolidating the finances of the colony, and with gradually developing the territories that had already been occupied, than with further expansion. Under Zimmerer, the Germans abandoned attempts to enter the principal Bell trading region in the Mungo River valley and turned instead to the Sanaga River, which they closed to all native traders. This resulted in a long-running dispute with the explorer Eugen Zintgraff, who had made an agreement with the Foreign Office in 1890 to establish a system of trading posts in the Western High Plateau of Cameroon. Zimmerer was removed from Cameroon in 1893 after a mutiny of police soldiers. On 20 July 1895, he was allowed to temporarily retire due to health considerations.

== Later career ==
Zimmerer subsequently served as Consul in Florianópolis, Brazil (1898); General Consul in Valparaíso, Chile (1902); and Minister Resident in Port-au-Prince, Haiti (1906), with title and rank of Envoy Extraordinary and Minister Plenipotentiary from 1907.

On 24 December 1910, he finally retired at his own request, returning to Germany and settling in Frankfurt am Main. He lived there for eight years until his death.
