= Former police station of Douala =

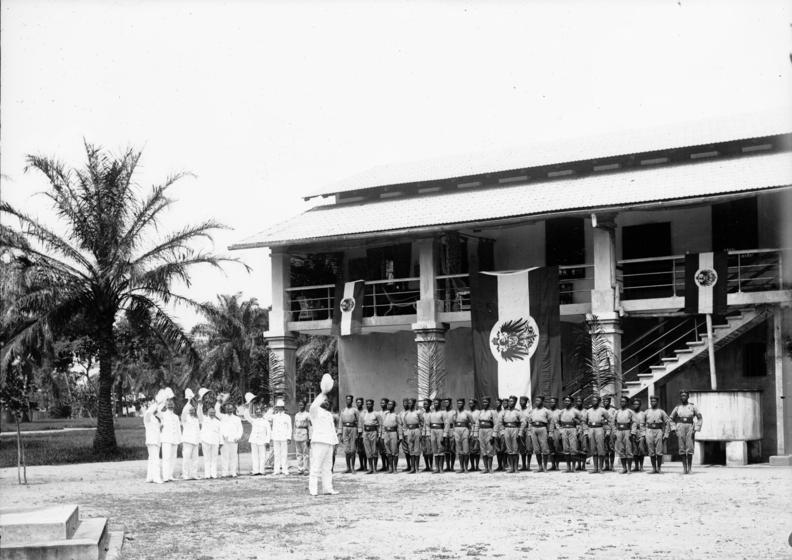
- Interactive map of the Former police station of Douala area

General information
- Type: police station
- Architectural style: German colonial architecture
- Location: Douala, Cameroon
- Coordinates: 4.04249°N 9.68565°E
- Current tenants: It hosts the merchant navy services
- Construction started: Late 19th century
- Completed: Beginning of the 20th century
- Client: The German government
- Owner: Government of Cameroon

The former police station situated in Douala is a building constructed at the beginning of the 20th century by the Germans to serve as the first police station under the German mandate.

== History ==
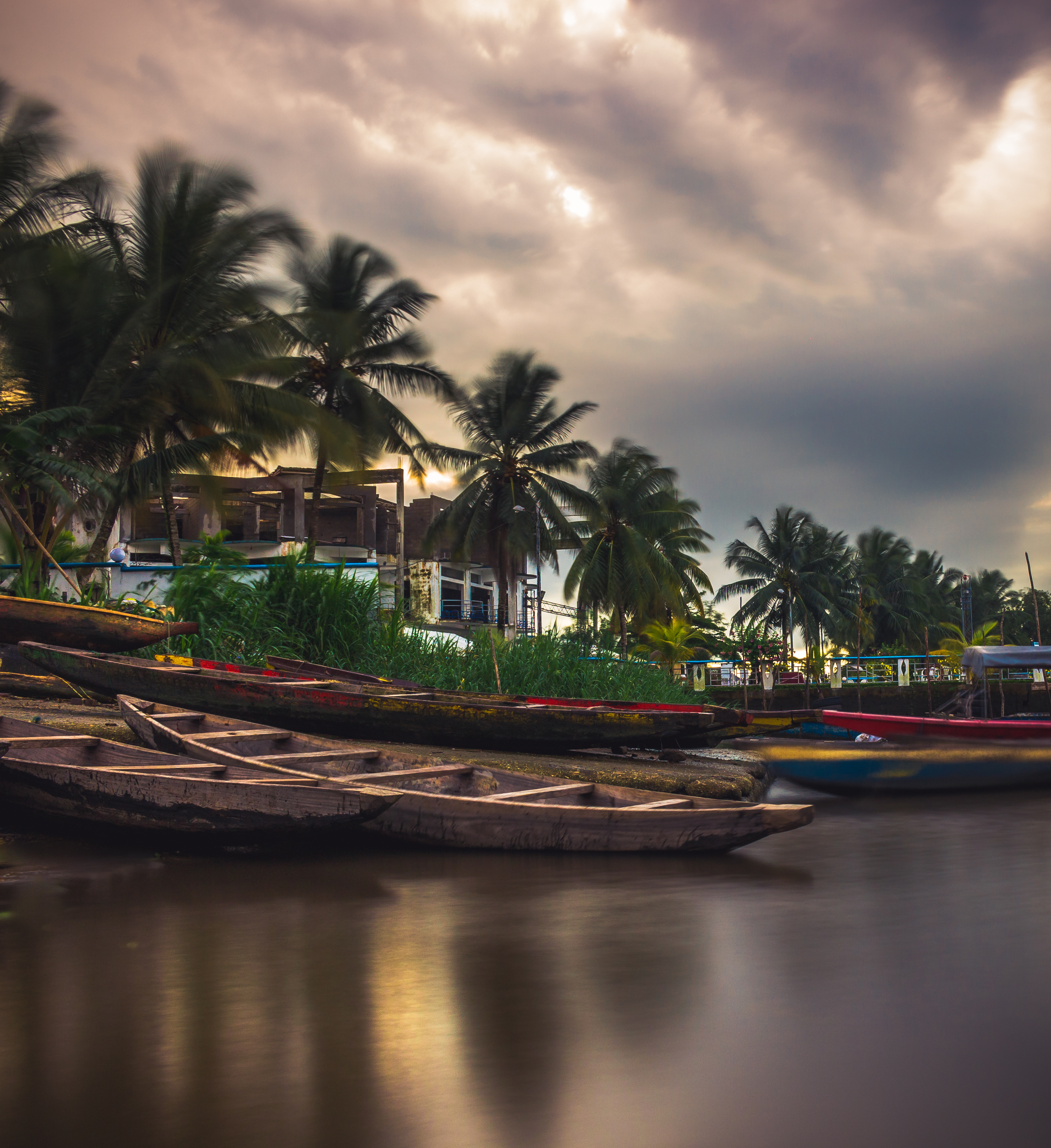
Banks of the Wouri River, Douala

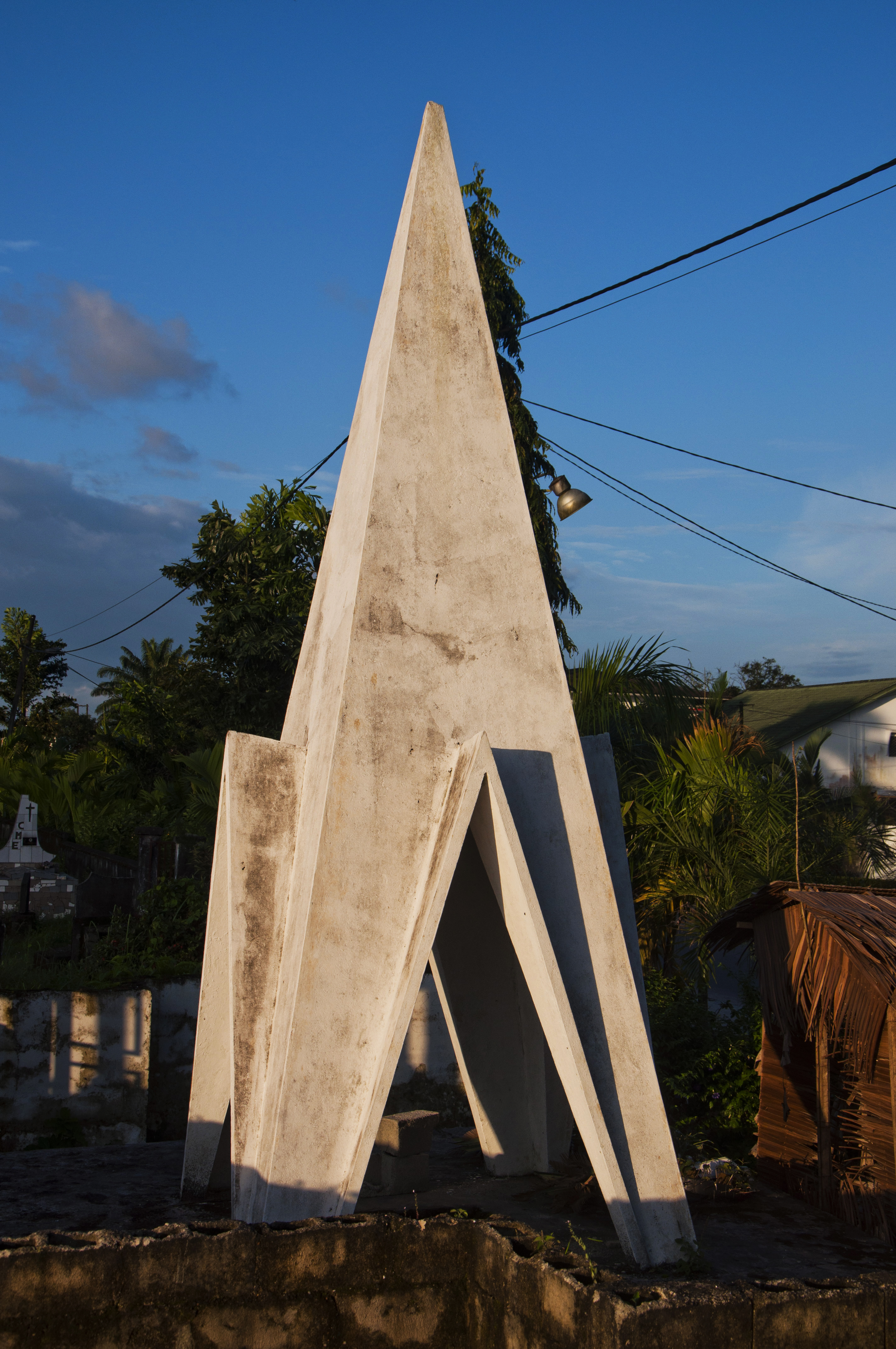
Monument of Din Ngosso

The police station is the site where King Rudolf Douala Manga Bell and his assistant Adolf Ngosso Din were sentenced to death and hung. Both men has been sentenced following their staunch opposition to the June 1910 Decree issued by Governor Ebermaier and ordering the expropriation and resettlement of natives from Joss, Bonapriso, Akwa and Deïdo. The Germans decided to seize the land along the banks of Wouri River, thus violating the sovereignty clause which left the land to the natives as specified in the treaty signed on July 12, 1884, between the Duala Kings and German authorities. On the other hand, a one-kilometre buffer zone or “Freie Zone” was established between the Whites and the Blacks. Rehousing sites were then created for displaced people: Neu Bell, Neu Akwa, and Neu Deïdo. From 1912 to 1914, commissioned by the Ngondo Vernacular Council, Rudolf and his assistant called for general mobilization in Cameroon and in Germany in order to defend their rights before the Reichstag, the German parliament. Nevertheless, the first expropriations began in December 1913. In May 1914, under the premise of a false document said to have been issued by King Bell and addressed to Sultan Njoya, which allegedly pleaded for an alliance with England, both protesters were caught, held in custody within this police station, sentenced for treason and hung on August 18, 1914. Only this stump is left of the tree from which they were hung. The First World War had just started in Europe. As hostile war ships sailed towards Cameroon, the Germans speeded up the trial in order to face the expected assaults from the enemy. At the same time, in an attempt to neutralise growing internal opposition, 180 natives were hung shortly after Rudolf and Ngosso Din. In September 1914, with the help of Duala canoeists, French and English troops got into the channel blocked with vessels the Germans had wrecked.

This edifice now hosts the merchant navy services.

In 2006 the building is highlighted by an urban sign produced by doual'art and designed by Sandrine Dole; the sign presents an historical image of the building and a description of its history.

== See also ==
- Kamerun
