= Henri Lobe Bell =

Duala leader in Kamerun

Henri Lobe Manga Bell was a Duala leader in Kamerun, who was installed by the German colonial administration to replace his brother. He was the younger brother of King Rudolf Duala Manga Bell; both were sons of King Auguste Manga Ndumbe Bell. He was deposed in 1920 by the French administration of Cameroon.

He was married to Olga Welly.
