= Manga Ndumbe Bell =

- Bell King of the Duala
- Reign: December 1897 – September 2, 1908
- Predecessor: Ndumbe Lobe Bell
- Successor: Rudolf Duala Manga Bell
- Born: c. 1851
- Died: September 2, 1908
- House: Bell

Auguste Manga Ndumbe Bell (c. 1851 – September 2, 1908) was a leader of the Duala people of southern Cameroon from 1897 to 1908 during the period after the German colonialists assumed control of the region as the Kamerun colony.

== Background ==
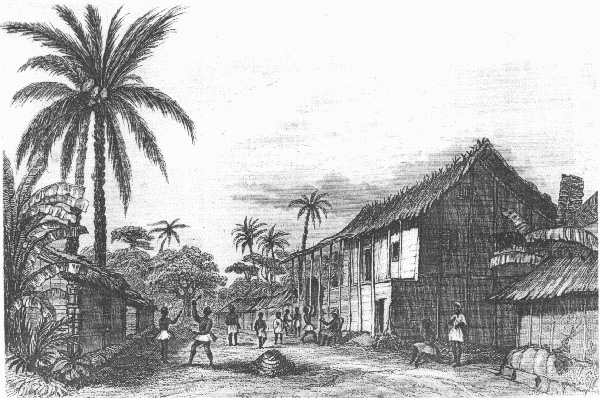
Bell royal house in 1841

The first European records of the people of the Douala region around the Wouri estuary noted that they were engaged in fishing and agriculture to some extent, but primarily were traders with the people of the interior via the Wouri River and its tributaries, and via the Dibamba, Kwa Kwa and Mungo rivers. In the 19th century they were bartering palm oil, palm kernels and ivory for European goods. Their leaders, whom the Europeans called "kings", came from the two lineages of Bell and Akwa.

== Early years ==
Manga came from the Bell lineage, son of King Ndumbe Lobe Bell. He was English-educated. In the period leading up to the German annexation, his family was in the ascendancy over the Akwa family, was particularly strong in the Mungo River trade and was highly regarded by the Europeans. However, after signature of the protection treaty in July 1884, the first German governor, Julius von Soden, favored the Akwa family. Manga was even exiled to Togo for two years on the basis that he was a "bad influence" in Douala. While in Togo, Manga became a friend of Eugen von Zimmerer, the German commissioner, who then became governor of Kamerun. On his return, Manga took pains to establish good relations with the other important colonial officials.

== Ruler ==
Wouri estuary showing Duala settlements around 1850

When his father Ndumbe Lobe Bell, generally known as "King Bell", died in December 1897, Manga Bell inherited his position and salary in exchange for taking greater responsibility for his people and supplying porters to the government. The next year, he was given appeals jurisdiction over all the native people of the Littoral region. As the colonial authorities became increasingly involved in administration of the region, tensions rose between the Bell and Akwa families and between the Duala people and the Germans. In 1902–1903 Manga Bell went to Germany to present his complaints and requests to the authorities. He was accompanied by his son Rudolf Duala Manga Bell, who was educated in Germany. The trip was successful, and Manga benefited personally from the grant of a valuable elephant licence.

Manga Bell was the first of the Duala to turn from trade to direct production of agricultural goods. The Atlantic Slave Trade had long been abolished, replaced by trade in palm oil and other produce, but the slave system had persisted internally and continued after the Germans took control. However, the slave owners were gradually forced to improve their treatment of slaves, whose position evolved to that of dependent farm workers. When Manga Bell started his first cocoa plantation, he had to provide gifts to his slaves to persuade them to work the new and unfamiliar crop. During his period of rule, the Mungo region gained almost 70% of the cocoa trade, almost entirely controlled by the Bells.

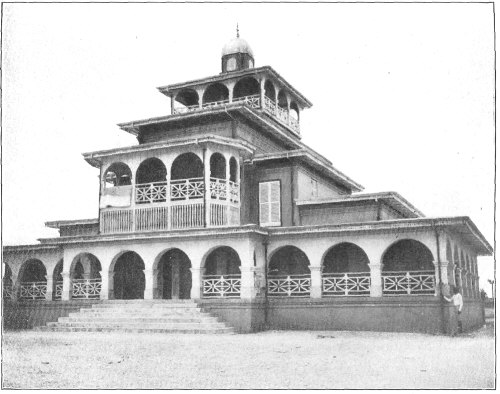
The "Pagoda", Manga's palace

Manga Bell built a palace in the center of Douala, also known as the "Pagoda" due to its architectural style, completed in 1905. Today, the Pagoda is one of the tourist attractions of the city. He died on 2 September 1908. Speaking at his funeral, the governor said "Duala people, the roof under which Whites and Blacks mingled has collapsed". Manga's position was passed on to his son, Duala, who was executed by the Germans in 1914 after attempting to stir up a revolt against the colonialists.
