= Mungo River (Cameroon) =

River in southwestern Cameroon

Coordinates: 4.555833°N 9.522778°E

Mungo River valley. The river and then the mountain line formed the boundary between the former British and French colonies.

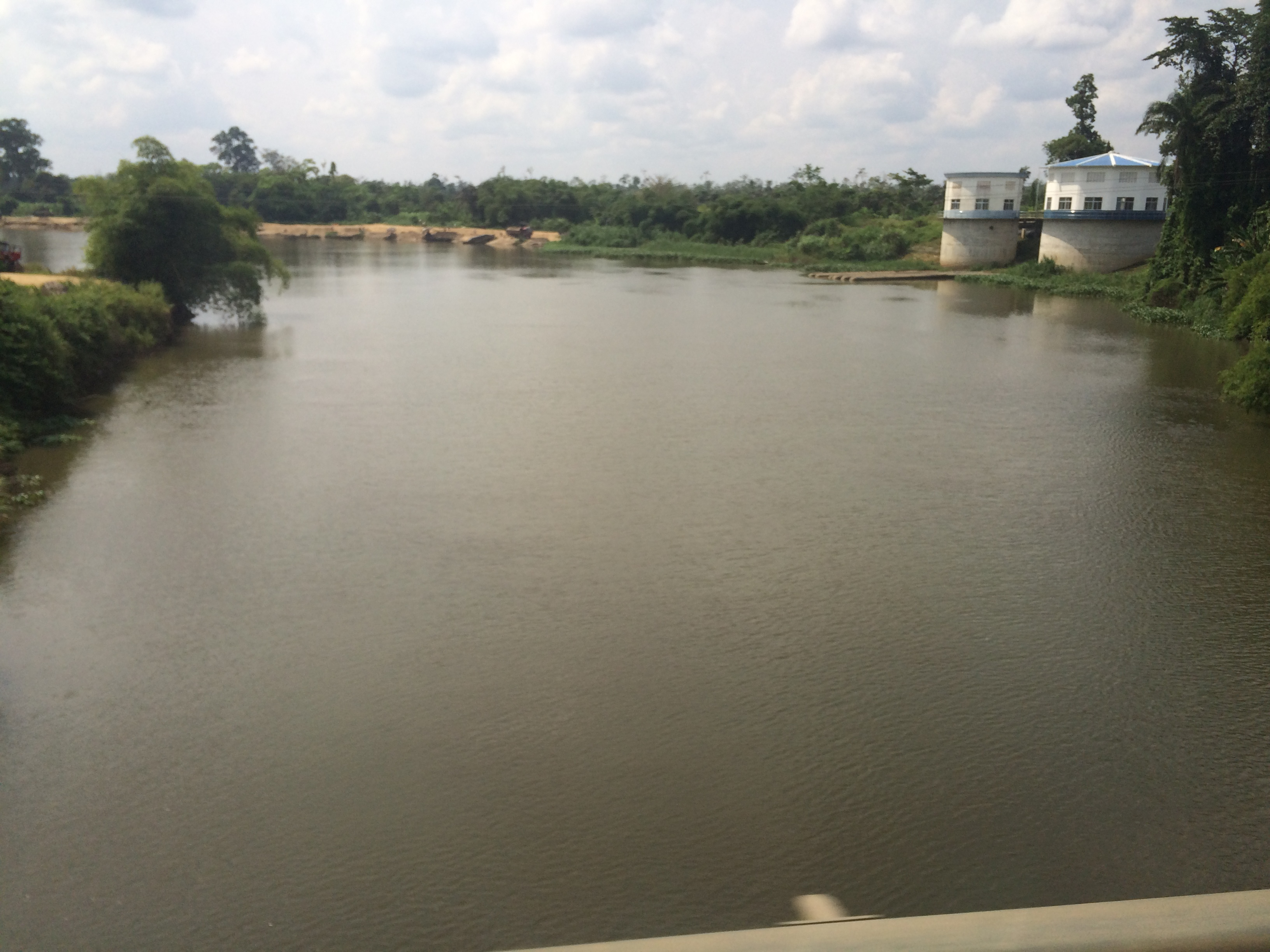
Mungo River

The Mungo River is a large river in Cameroon that drains the mountains in the southern portion of the Cameroon line of active and extinct volcanoes.

== Course ==
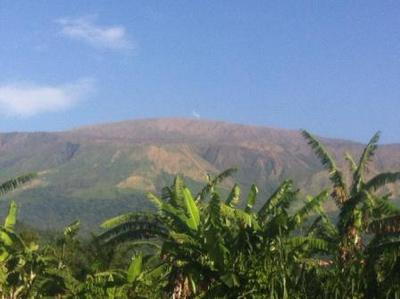
Mount Kupe

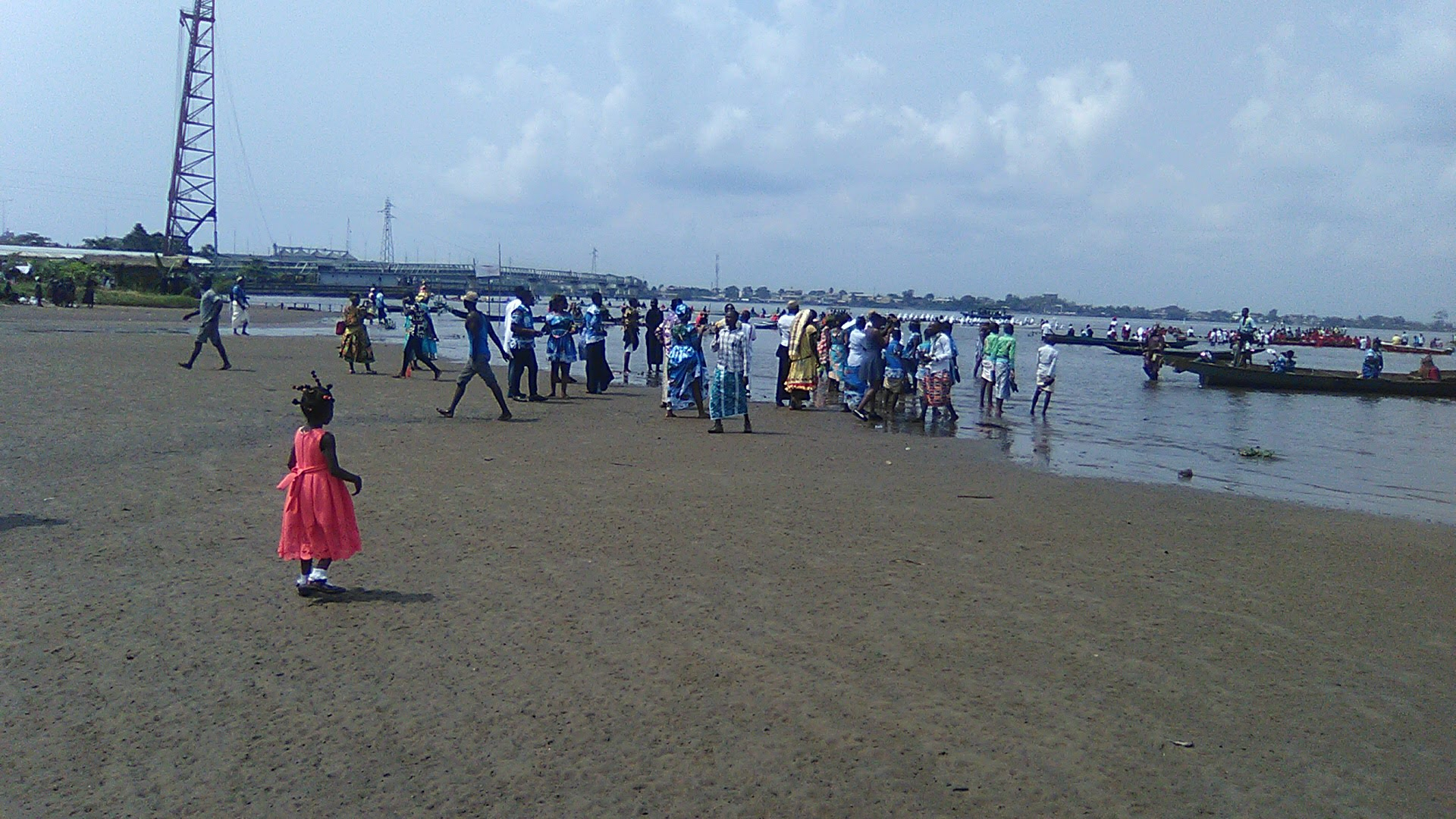
Wouri River

The Mungo river has a catchment area of 4,200 square kilometres (1,600 sq mi). The river is 150 kilometres (93 mi) long, rising in the Rumpi Hills and swelled by tributaries from Mount Kupe and the Bakossi Mountains. The river is navigable south of Mundame for about 100 kilometres (62 mi) as it flows through the coastal plain before entering mangrove swamps, where it splits into numerous small channels that empty into the Cameroon estuary complex. The estuary, which is also fed rivers such as the Wouri and Dibamba, in turn discharges into the Gulf of Guinea at Douala Point. The tidal bores in the bay travels as far as 40 kilometres (25 mi) up the river. In this section of the river, large flats and sand banks are exposed at low tide.

A European visitor said of the lower reaches of the river in 1896: "The banks of the Mungo are magnificently covered with forests ... and everything here teems with life. One can see sea eagles, herons, snakes and monkeys, as well as multicolored parrots on the trees, while on the surface of the water there dance butterflies and dragonflies the size of sparrows. Now and then one hears the trumpeting of elephants, the cry of predators, and the melancholy and monotonous honking of the iguana." He noted that about 35 kilometres (22 mi) from the mouth of the river the forest began to be cleared for cultivation of plantains, cocoyams, corn and sugar cane.

== History ==
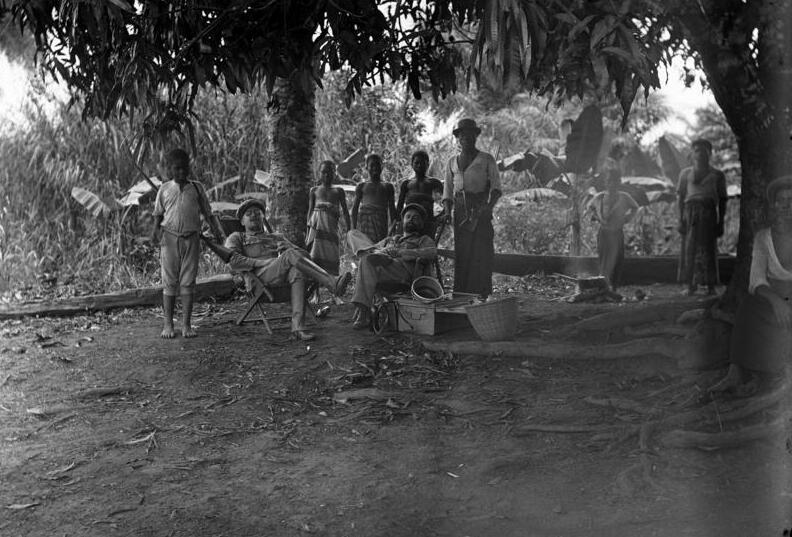
Two white settlers and local children and men on the Mungo River, Christmas 1901

A Swede named Knut Knutson lived for some years in the upper Mungo valley at a time when the Germans were asserting their claim over the area as a colony. He provides an interesting if somewhat fanciful account of traditions that a "Biaffra" tribe, based on the upper Mungo, once ruled an extensive kingdom stretching as far north as Lake Chad and south to the Congo River. Another early European exploration of the river was undertaken by the Polish explorer Stefan Szolc-Rogozinski in 1883. He was hoping to establish a free colony for Polish emigrants.

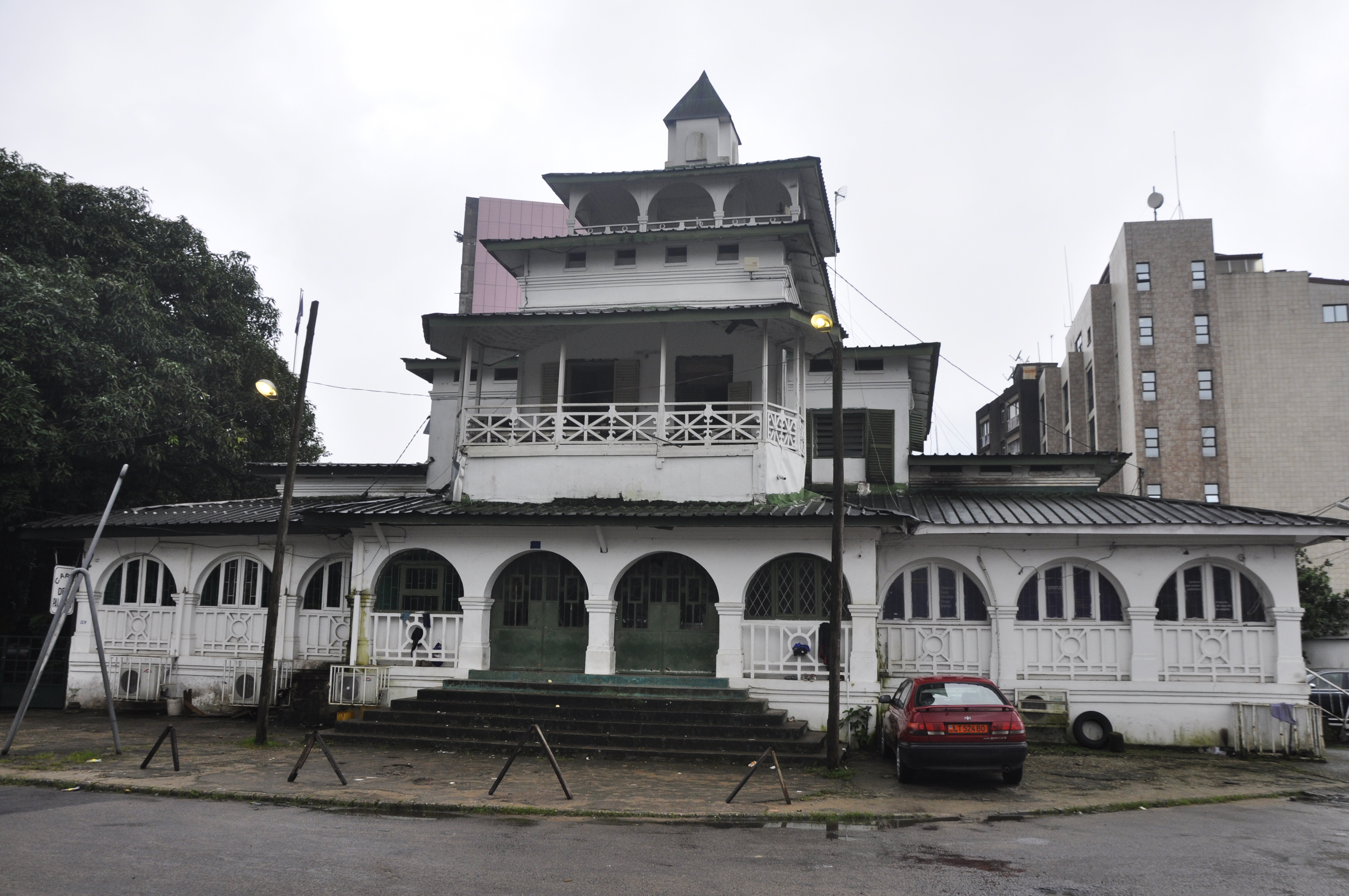
Kings Bell Palace

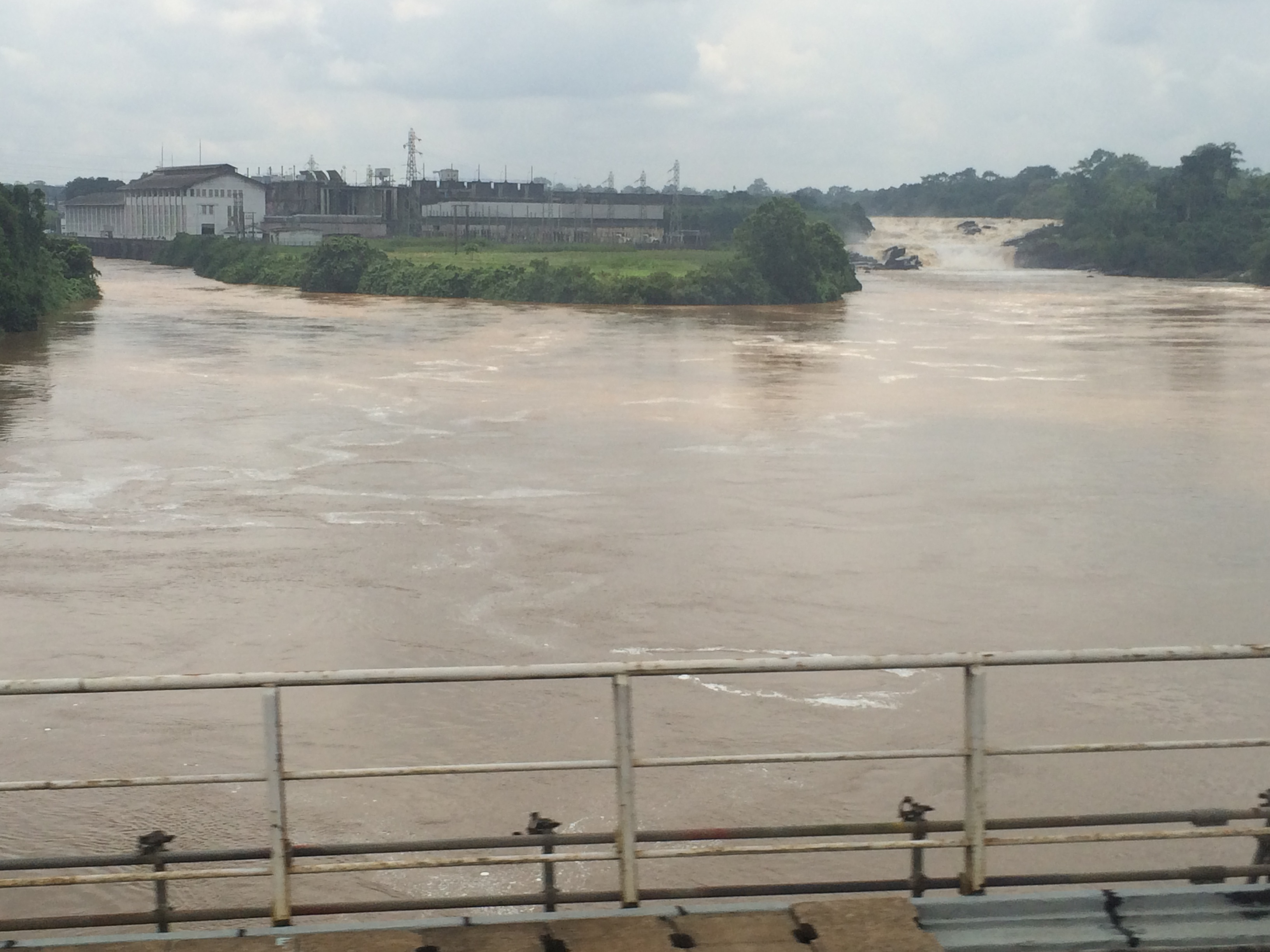
Sanaga River

Towards the end of 1884, after the Germans had established a post at Douala, they ran into trouble with the local Duala chiefs who were encouraged by the British to resist German attempts to open direct trade with the interior. The leader on the Mungo river was King Bell, who maintained a blockade for some months but eventually was forced to yield due to disunity among his people and the power of an armed steamboat. Later, the Bell's regained control for a while when the Germans turned their attention to the Sanaga River.

When the German colony of Kamerun was partitioned after World War I, the Mungo River formed part of the boundary between the French and British colonies that assumed control. The border also divided the different peoples of the river valley, including the Bakossi people, although they continued to maintain close relations across the river. Downstream, near the coast, the Duala and Mungo people were similarly divided.

== Recent times ==
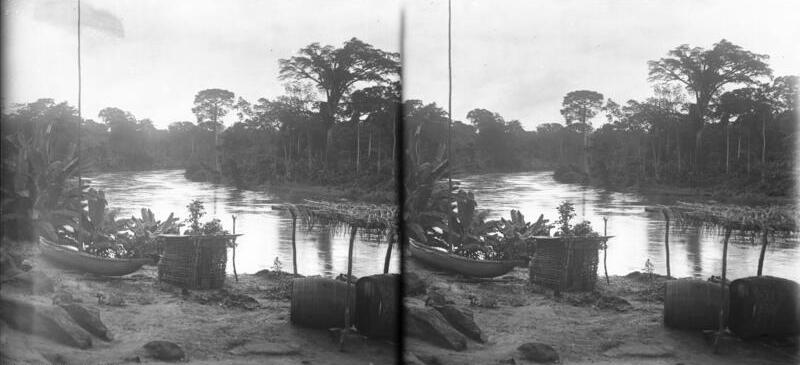
Stereoscope photograph of Cabin and canoe on the Mungo river near Mundame, 1904

Today, the river forms the boundary between the Littoral and the Southwest regions of Cameroon. A bridge over the river collapsed in 2004. As of December 2006, work on construction of a replacement bridge was still in progress, and road traffic was meanwhile depending on a floating bridge, or barge. The ecology of the estuary is under threat from growing pollution from industry, farming and households, threatening both fish yields and human health. Notables from Mungo – E.J Embola
