= Gustav Conrau =

German trader and explorer (1865–1899)

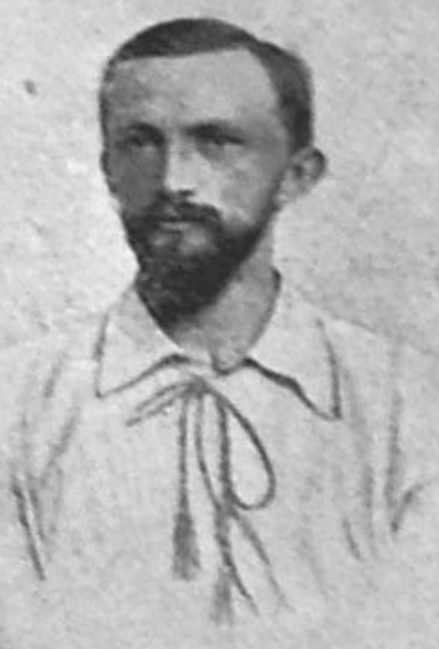
- Gustav Conrau, c. 1892
- Born: 2 October 1865; Forsthaus Priemern, Saxony, Kingdom of Prussia
- Died: December 1899 (aged 34); Fontem village, German Kamerun
- Occupations: commercial agent for German trading companies and museums
- Years active: c. 1890–1899
- Employer: Jantzen & Thormählen
- Known for: Collection of statues and plants in late 19th-century Africa

Gustav Conrau (2 October 1865 – December 1899) was a German trader and explorer in the former German colony Kamerun. Apart from his mission of finding commercial opportunities for German trading companies, he acquired African traditional statues, species of botanical plants and of indigenous animals that he sent to museums in the German Empire.

Since the late 19th century, ethnological and later art museums as well as private collectors in Europe and America have shown an increasing appreciation of African traditional sculptures, and sculptures collected by Conrau in the Bangwa kingdom of Cameroon have become internationally known as masterpieces of African art.

In 1899, Conrau was held captive by his former trading partner, chief Assunganyi, following a failed agreement to transport goods, in which Conrau had returned without the Bangwa porters. Despite being imprisoned, Conrau still had access to a firearm and tried to escape. According to later reports, Conrau fatally shot himself to avoid being captured again. The German colonial authorities exiled Assunganyi in retaliation for Conrau's death.

== Biography ==
=== Historical background ===
Kamerun was an African colony of the German Empire from 1884 to 1916 in the region of today's Republic of Cameroon. Before the establishment of the colony, the first German trading post in the Duala area of present-day Douala on the Kamerun River delta, now the Wouri River delta, was established in 1868 by the Hamburg trading company Carl Woermann. The firm's primary agent in Gabon, Johannes Thormählen, expanded activities to the Kamerun River delta. In 1874, Thormählen founded his own company Jantzen & Thormählen with the Woermann agent in Liberia, Wilhelm Jantzen.

Both of these trading houses expanded into using their own sailing ships and steamers and inaugurated scheduled passenger and freight service between Hamburg and Duala. These companies and others obtained land from local chiefs and began systematic plantation operations, including for bananas. The Cameroon territory had been under the informal control of the British Empire throughout the years preceding 1884, with substantial British trading operations as well.

Eventually, the German companies began agitating for imperial protection. By 1884, Adolph Woermann, as spokesman for all German companies operating in West Africa, petitioned the imperial foreign office for "protection" by the German Empire. This, among a number of other factors, led to Imperial Chancellor Otto von Bismarck approving the establishment of a colony, an action recognised in the treaties of the Berlin Conference in 1885.

Upon the establishment of the colony, German colonial troops took control of the coastal region and seized vast tracts of land to establish areas for rubber and palm oil production. The direct result for the indigenous population was that property was confiscated, villages burned, chiefs murdered or imprisoned, and many adults were coerced into unpaid labour for the German companies that run the plantations. This colonisation involved plantation agents travelling into the interior to find more workers. Some were also assigned the task of mapping the countryside and exploring for prospective resources. One of these agents was the German trader, explorer and collector Gustav Conrau.

=== Early life and activities in Kamerun ===
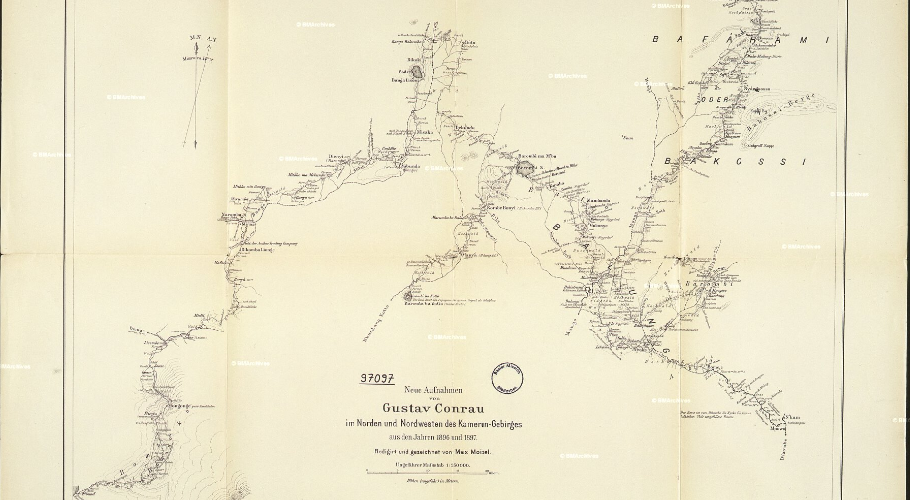
Map based on Conrau's travels in Kamerun

Conrau was born in rural Saxony, Kingdom of Prussia, on 2 October 1865. Having arrived in the then-German colony Kamerun at age twenty-five in 1890, he started as independent agent for the trading company Jantzen & Thormählen, who were exporting goods such as rubber, palm oil and ivory from their coastal shipping station to Germany.

Active in various ways of exploring the country's interior, Conrau was the first Westerner who traveled into the hinterland in north-western Kamerun. Based on this, he published ethnographic articles about indigenous people in these regions. During an expedition in 1891 into the Kamerun hinterland, Conrau accompanied German explorer Eugen Zintgraff, making use of his knowledge of local customs and geography. In 1894, his cartographic survey, which linked the local towns Mundame in south-western Cameroon and Bali Nyonga in the Northwest, was published in Germany.

To provide for his livelihood, Conrau was hunting for elephants and ivory. Except for occasional visits to Germany, Conrau spent almost 9 years in Kamerun, often on long stays accompanied only by his African translator and several porters. Apart from his lay ethnological work and geographical notes, he also gathered zoological and botanical specimens for scientific collections in Germany.

Conrau first established contact with the Bangwa area in December 1898, looking for rubber, ivory and workers for his employer's plantations on the coast. In the Fontem region of the south-western grassland, Conrau was welcomed by the young and wealthy chief Assunganyi (c. 1880–1951) of the Kingdom of Lebang, who controlled an extensive trading network. During his stay in the chief's palace called Azi, the two exchanged gifts and merchandise. Upon Conrau's request, they agreed that Conrau could take about 80 of Assunganyi's men to carry goods towards the coastal plantations.

=== Death ===
In 1899 Conrau returned without the porters. He demanded more men, as many of the first ones had allegedly died of malaria and fever. Assunganyi demanded compensation and detained Conrau. In captivity, Conrau wrote a letter to his German business partners, asking for money to pay for the missing workers. Despite being imprisoned, Conrau had access to a firearm, and when no answer came, he tried to escape, as he had indicated he would in his letter. According to later reports by Conrau's local interpreter Lanschi, Conrau was stopped by local guards and slightly injured. After he had fired at his captors, Conrau fatally shot himself to avoid being captured again. As a consequence, the German colonial authorities sent a retaliatory force. They burned down Assunganyi's palace buildings and sent him into exile. Following this, the German colonial authorities established a garrison at the site.

== Collector ==
=== Collector of statues ===
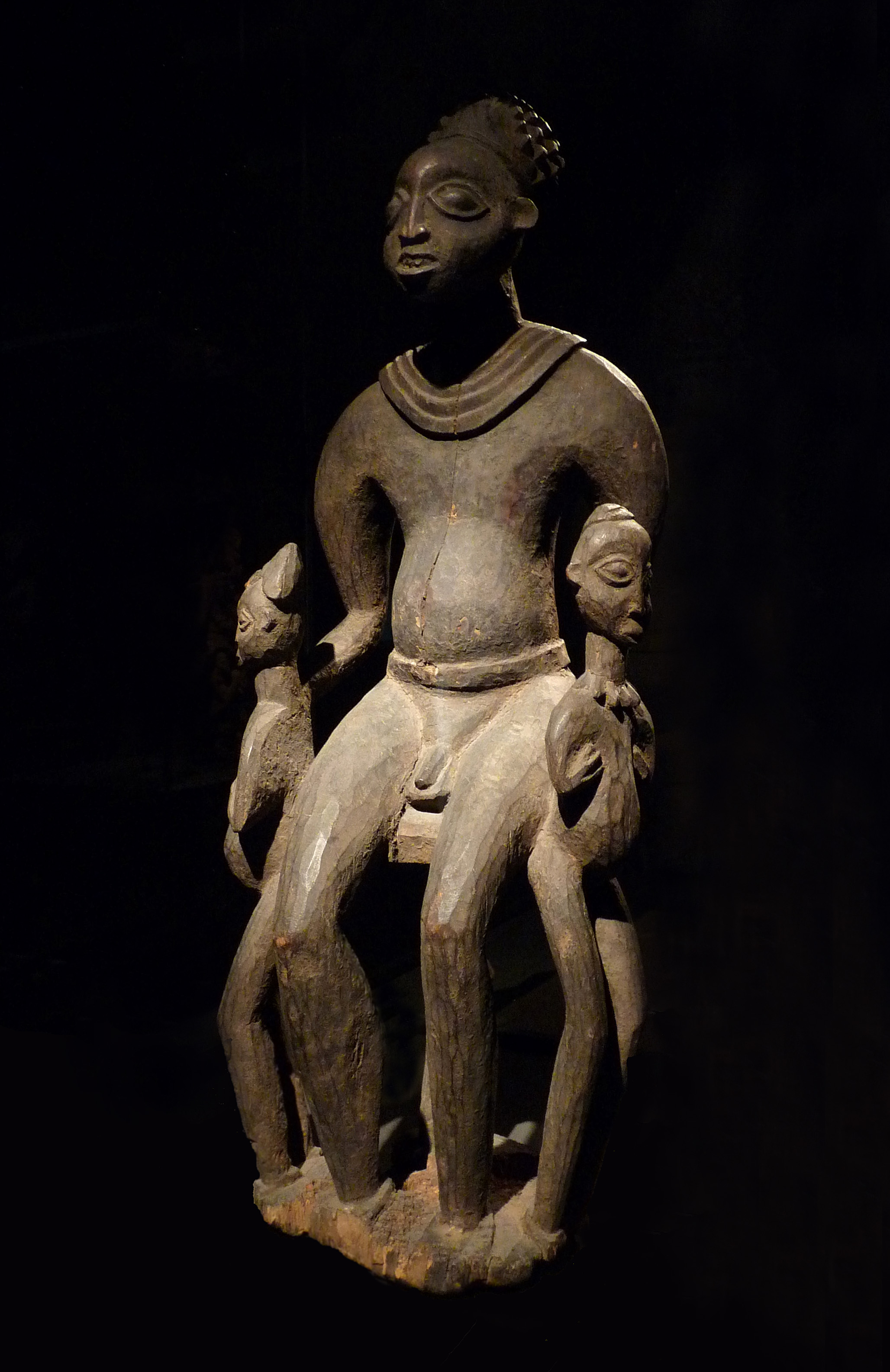
Male figure with twins, Bangwa ethnic group, Ethnological Museum of Berlin, collected by Gustav Conrau

Since 1898, Conrau acquired and sent information about traditional Bangwa statues to Felix von Luschan, the assistant director of the Königliches Museum für Völkerkunde in Berlin, the present-day Ethnological Museum. For three shipments in 1898 and 1899, Conrau was paid 1,300 German Mark by the Berlin museum. During these years, Conrau and von Luschan exchanged correspondence with ethnographic information on traditions, sculptures and masks of the Bangwa region and beyond. In this correspondence, Conrau mentioned that he had to carefully and sometimes secretly obtain the necessary permission by Assunganyi and other chiefs to buy sculptures and other cultural items. The disregard for older sculptures and masks when newer ones covered by imported glass beads were crafted allegedly made it easier for Conrau to obtain such older pieces.

Among the pieces Conrau acquired as gifts or by exchange was one that later became known as the "Bangwa Queen". This wooden statue of a female Bangwa royal was later exchanged by the Berlin museum for other African works with a private collector in Berlin. In the 1930s, it was sold to the American businesswoman Helena Rubinstein for her collection of African pieces of art. After a 1999 auction, the Bangwa Queen entered the collection of the Musée Dapper and in 2006 of the Musée du Quay Branly in Paris.

Bangwa sculptures collected by Conrau, such as that of King Fosia, attributed to the sculptor Ateu Atsa, and of a Tanyi priest with twins on either side are held in the Ethnological Museum Berlin and other European museums. Others have been incorporated as masterpieces of traditional African art into the collections of the Cleveland Museum of Art, the Metropolitan Museum of Art and the Eskenazi Museum of Art at Indiana University in the US.

=== Collector of plants and animal species ===
Conrau's scientific collection of plants is kept at the Berlin Botanical Garden and Botanical Museum in Dahlem. The scientific names of several plant species (or varieties) collected in western Cameroon are named after him, including Agelaea conraui, Allophylus conraui, Ardisia conraui, Baphia leptostemma var. conraui, Ficus conraui, Millettia conraui and Salacia conrauii.

In the scientific classification of animals, the gecko species Lygodactylus conraui, the subspecies Conraua goliath and the genus Conraua, in the Conrauidae family, were named after Conrau. Conrau had sent specimens of these animals as well as human remains to the Natural History Museum in Berlin.

== Reception ==
In 2007, Robert Brain, an anthropologist who had lived with the Bangwa in the 1960s, published a short novelistic account of Conrau's earliest visit to Fontem. Drawing on historical and anthropological research, the chapter "Azi since Conrau" in the same volume discussed the transformations that Azi, the traditional centre of the Fontem region, has undergone in the century since Conrau's arrival and early death. Referring to the nature of historical accounts about European "explorers" such as Conrau, the authors of the chapter, one of whom is a Bangwa historian, remarked:

Like most accounts of how Europe penetrated Africa, it is a story written from a European perspective. There has been a movement within anthropology to deconstruct the hegemony of a privileged Western viewpoint, firstly by making it visible and including the position of the observing, writing subject in the discourse, and secondly by inviting alternative voices to find expression alongside those of the Western observer. [...] While Conrau’s visits to Azi marked a turning point in Nweh [local] history, they were also part of a much longer process of interaction between Europe and Africa involving the long-distance trade in slaves and other goods.

— Michael Mbapndah Ndobegang and Fiona Bowie, "Azi since Conrau"

An article by The Continent, a weekly newspaper produced by African authors and titled "The Museum of Stolen History", covered the story of Conrau and the "Bangwa Queen" from an African perspective in 2025. In particular, it referred to the statue as "Ngwi Ndem, the divine spouse who intercedes for those seeking fertility, bountiful harvests, and protection against evil." Further, the article quoted Chief Charles Taku, Assunganyi's great-grandson and a lead counsel at the International Criminal Court, saying that Conrau had stolen the sculpture and dozens of others.

=== Claims for restitution ===
In the context of growing re-assessments of collections of African traditional art in Western museums, calls for the restitution of African cultural heritage and the decolonisation of museums have argued that the history of such collections is marked by "close links between private collecting, museum networks, and colonial violence" – in the case of the Conrau collection as a manifestation of historical German efforts to extend control over its colonies.

During a 2021 conference on provenance research about collections from colonial contexts, Chief Charles A. Taku raised legal and moral considerations, arguing for the restitution of Bangwa cultural heritage to its community of origin in Cameroon.

== Literature ==
- Brain, Robert; Pollock, Adam (1971). Bangwa Funerary Sculpture. London: Duckworth. ISBN 978-0-7156-0517-2.
- Campfens, Evelien (2019). "The Bangwa Queen: Artifact or Heritage?". International Journal of Cultural Property. 26 (1): 75–110. doi:10.1017/S0940739119000043. ISSN 0940-7391.
- Letouzey, René (1968). Les Botanistes au Cameroun. Flore du Cameroun (in French). Vol. 7. National Museum of Natural History, France. p. 18.
- von Lintig, Bettina (2016). "Das 'Hinterland der Küste'. Über die Hintergründe der Kamerun-Sammlungen von Gustav Conrau – neuester Stand der Forschung in einem erinnerungs- und geschichtskulturellen Prozess". Kunst & Kontex (in German). 1: 31–35.
