= Woermann =

Woermann may refer to

- Adolph Woermann
  - SS Adolph Woermann
- Karl Woermann
- Woermann-Linie
- Woermann Tower
- Woermann's bat
