= Cameroon–Germany relations =

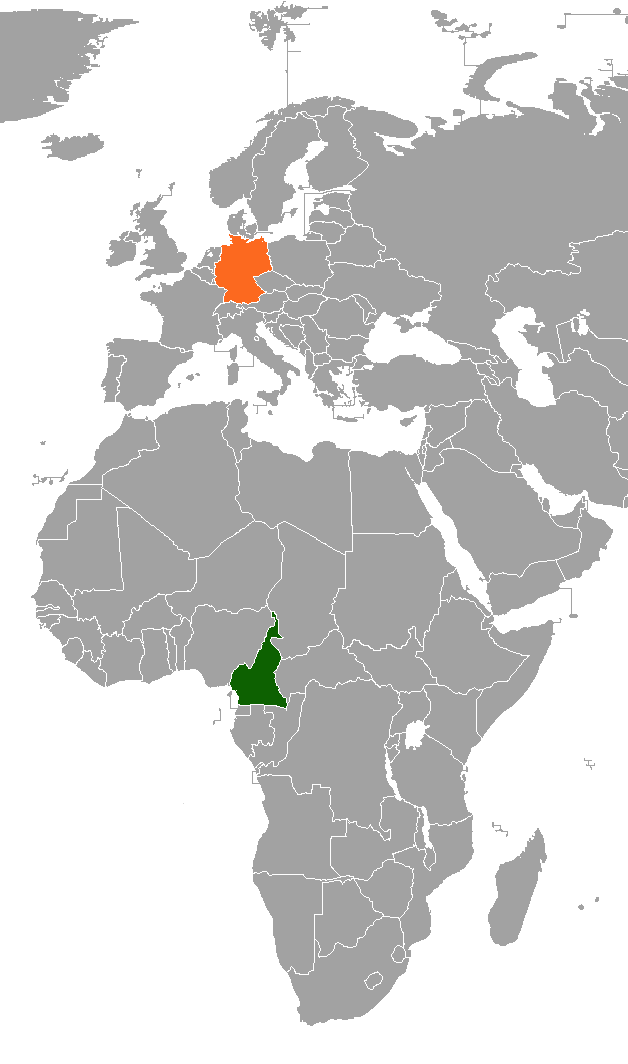

- Cameroon: Germany

Cameroon–Germany relations are described as "good" by the German Foreign Office. The two countries share a long common history and Cameroon was a colony of Germany from 1884 to 1918. Also due to German involvement in development cooperation, Germany is "positively perceived" in the country today.

== History ==
The German presence in Cameroon dates back to the 19th century. In 1861, the British explorer Richard Francis Burton and the German botanist Gustav Mann became the first Europeans to climb Mount Cameroon. A few years later, the trading house of Adolph Woermann established a site in Douala. In 1884, the colonial companies Jantzen & Thormählen and Woermann concluded a mutual assistance pact with the local rulers and the German colony of Kamerun was established. Gustav Nachtigal became the first Reichskommissar in charge of the territory, and a German expeditionary corps put down the ensuing popular uprising. The interior of the country was gradually explored and subdued, and German traders and missionaries settled in the colony. In 1902, Hans Dominik conquered Northern Cameroon after defeating the Adamawa Emirate. In 1911, the Morocco-Congo Treaty expanded the colony to include the territory of New Cameroon. Today, the territory of New Cameroon is part of Chad, the Central African Republic, the Republic of Congo and Gabon.

The colony of Kamerun was the most economically productive of the colonies for the German Empire. For this purpose, the population was exploited and a system of plantation economy was raised. The colony supplied rubber, ivory, cocoa, palm oil and palm kernels to the Metropole and in return received frying oil and weapons from Germany. Overall, however, trade with the colonies remained of secondary importance to the German Empire compared to trade with its more developed neighboring countries. After Germany's defeat in World War I, the colony was divided between the United Kingdom and France.

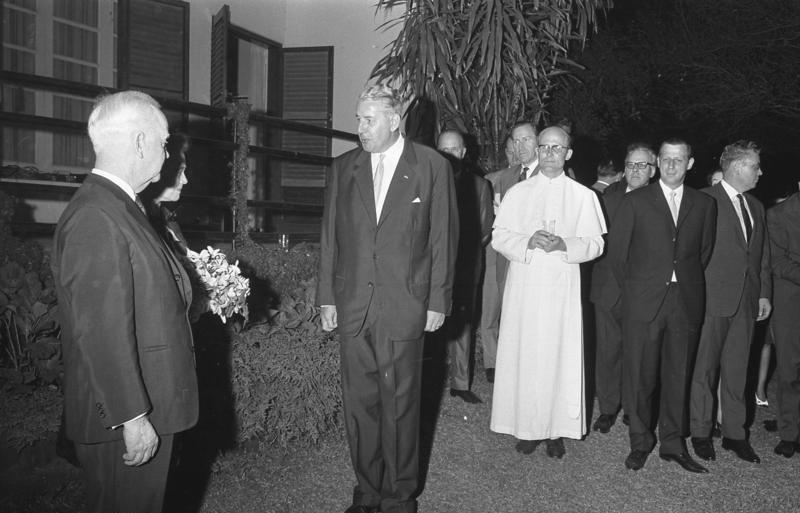
Präsident Lübke in Cameroon (1963)

An embassy of West Germany in Cameroon was established in 1960, the year of the country's independence and three years later, Heinrich Lübke visited the African state. After the end of the Hallstein Doctrine in 1973, Cameroon also established diplomatic relations with East Germany. For Cameroon, West Germany became an important donor of development aid. State visits by Cameroonian presidents Ahmadou Ahidjo and Paul Biya to West Germany took place in 1963 and 1986, respectively. In 1987, Helmut Kohl became the first German chancellor to visit Cameroon.

== Economic relations ==
Economic relations between Germany and Cameroon are still poorly developed and few German companies invest in the country due to difficult conditions in the country. Bilateral trade volume in 2021 amounted to 206 million euros, with Germany importing 82 million euros worth of goods from the country and supplying 124 million euros worth of goods in return. Thus, trade with Cameroon shows little significance for German foreign trade.

== Development aid ==
For Cameroon, Germany is the most important donor country in development aid. Between 2017 and 2019, aid was over 100 million euros. German development organizations in the country include, in addition to NGOs and private foundations, the Gesellschaft für Internationale Zusammenarbeit (GIZ), the Kreditanstalt für Wiederaufbau (KfW), the German Investment Corporation (DEG), the Federal Institute for Geosciences and Natural Resources (BGR), the Civil Peace Service (ZFD), the Senior Expert Service (SES), the Diakonie Deutschland, Brot für die Welt, and the Sparkassenstiftung, which support projects in the country.

Joint development cooperation focuses on "decentralization and good governance," "sustainability of resource use," and "rural development." In addition, Germany is helping to build up the health care system in the country and to cope with refugee flows from neighboring countries.

== Culture and education ==
There are close cultural ties between Cameroon and Germany, and there are quite a few civil society links between associations and organizations, as well as partnerships between church congregations from both countries. The Goethe-Institut maintains a branch office in the country. German science and technology have a good reputation in the country, and nearly 2000 teachers teach the German language to nearly 200,000 students in the country, making German the second most popular foreign language in the country. The German Academic Exchange Service (DAAD) and the Alexander von Humboldt Foundation support academic exchange. With nearly 7000 students (2019), Cameroonian students are the largest group of international students from Africa in Germany.

== Migration ==
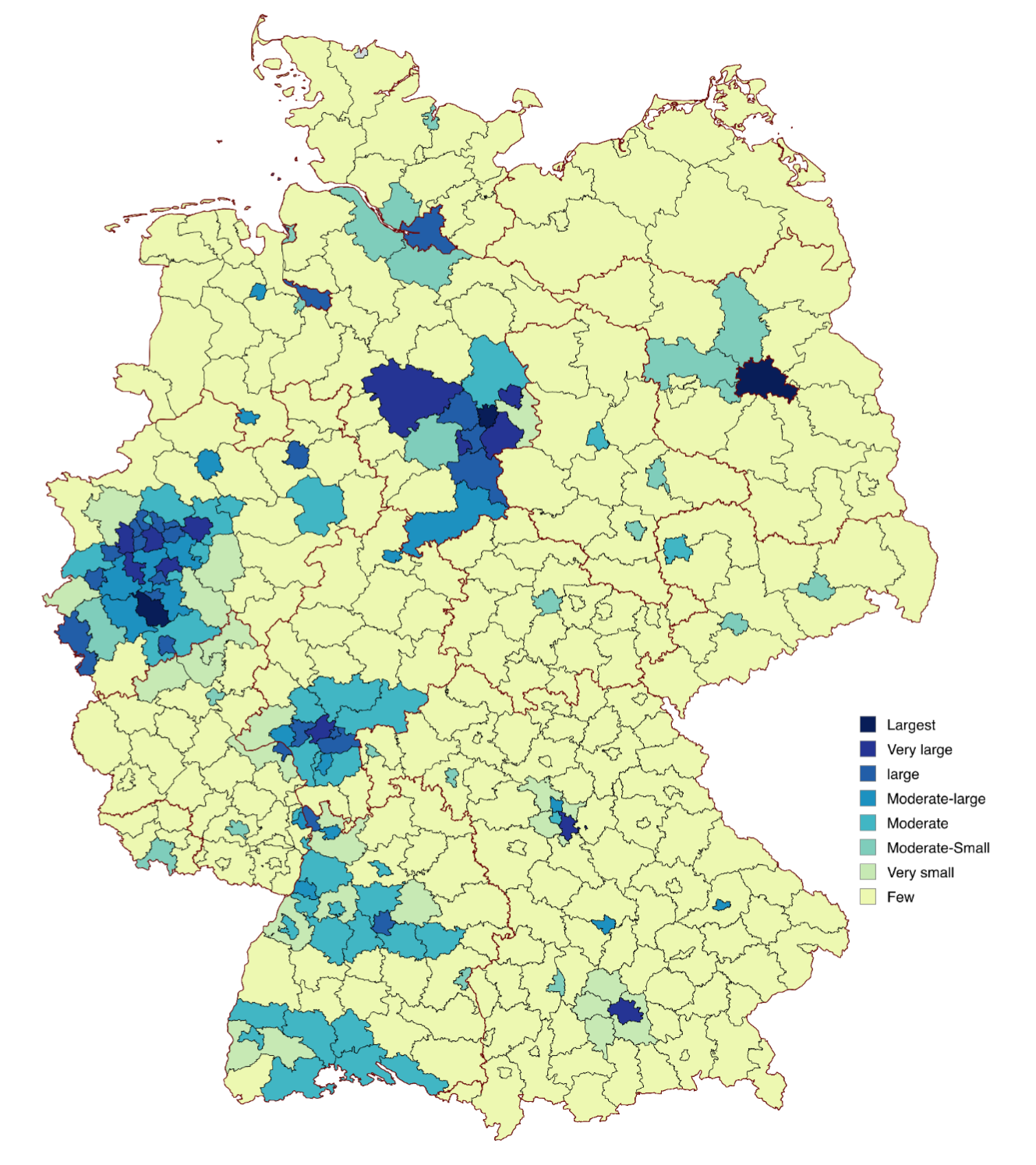
Cameroonian diaspora in Germany

There were 27,545 Cameroonians living in Germany in 2021. More than a third of Cameroonians in Germany are study abroad students.

Cities with notable Cameroonian populations are Cologne, Düsseldorf, Braunschweig, Berlin, Nuremberg and Munich. The metropolitan regions Rhine-Ruhr, Frankfurt Rhine-Main and Braunschweig-Salzgitter-Wolfsburg (which has around 4,600 Cameroonians), have the most significant amount of migrants with a Cameroonian background.

Rank	City	Population
1	Berlin	3,937
2	Braunschweig	2,233
3	Köln	1,766
4	Wolfenbüttel	751
5	Wolfsburg	617
6	Frankfurt	315
7	Düsseldorf	229
8	Essen	221
9	Hanover	216
10	Nürnberg	186

== Sports ==
The Cameroon national football team is one of the most successful national teams in Africa and has been coached several times by German managers. Among them were Peter Schnittger (1970–1973), Winfried Schäfer (2001–2004), Otto Pfister (2007–2009) and Volker Finke (2013–2015). At the 2002 World Cup, the Cameroonian team coached by Winfried Schäfer faced Germany in the group stage. Germany won 2–0 and advanced to the knockout phase.

Cameroonian footballers who have been active in German football include Pierre Womé, Rigobert Song, Serge Branco and Timothée Atouba. There are many prominent German-Cameroonian footballers, some of whom were also active for either or even both national teams, such as Eric Maxim Choupo-Moting, Joel Matip, Armel Bella-Kotchap, Marcel Ndjeng and Youssoufa Moukoko. Former footballer Célia Šašić was of Cameroonian descent on her father's side and was twice named Women's Footballer of the Year (2012 and 2015).

== Diplomatic missions ==
- Germany has an embassy in Yaoundé.
- Cameroon has an embassy in Berlin.
