= Jantzen & Thormählen =

German firm

House flag of Jantzen & Thormählen

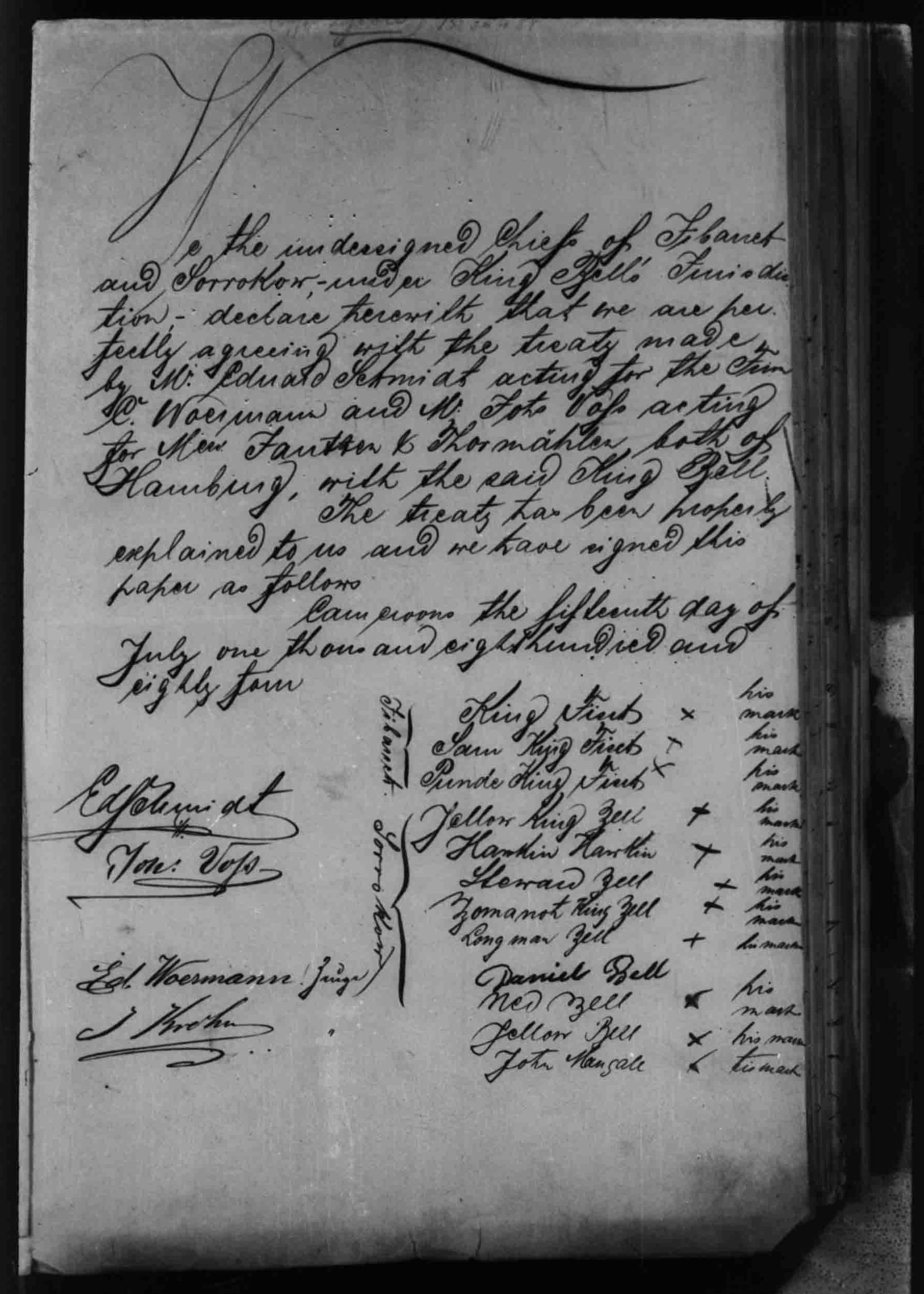
Document in which 12 African Chiefs from Cameroon confirm the 12 July 1884 German-Duala "Protection" Treaty between King Bell and King Akwa (kings of the Duala people) and Eduard Schmidt for Woermann Co and Johannes Voss for Thormälen Co.

Jantzen & Thormählen was a German firm based in Hamburg that was established to exploit the resources of Cameroon. The firm's commercial and political influence was a major factor in the establishment of the colony of Kamerun in 1884.

== Coastal trade ==
Until the later part of the 19th century, most German trade with Africa passed through Hamburg. The Carl and Adolf Woermann Firm, established in 1837 by the Hamburg merchant Carl Woermann, entered the West African market in 1849 and came to dominate the trade of the region. Jantzen and Thormahlen were initially agents of Adolph Woermann's Woermann-Linie. Johannes Thormählen was the firm’s agent in Gabon, and Wilhelm Jantzen was the Woermann agent in Liberia. After they established their own firm in 1875, they maintained contact with Woermann. Woermann, Jantzen & Thormählen and other German firms controlled a network of trading posts in different parts of West Africa. About half the trade with Kamerun was German-controlled.

The traders were mainly interested in selling goods including guns and liquor in return for palm products, and had no interest in permanent colonization. In fact, they preferred to operate informally and without interference from German civil servants, and opposed annexation. Many felt that African traders working on credit produced better results at lower cost than European agents, who were hard to recruit and were prone to sickness.

The shift toward favoring permanent colonies was driven by two factors: a fall in the prices of African products created a demand to bypass the local African traders and establish direct routes to the interior; and once firms such as Jantzen & Thormählen had established bases and plantations they required military protection.

== Annexation of Kamerun ==
Wouri estuary showing Duala settlements around 1850

Trade with the interior of Cameroon was handled by the Duala people settled at the mouth of the Wouri River in the area now covered by the city of Douala. They were led by two "kings" representing the Bell and Akwa factions. The rival Duala groups were plagued by disputes. Their leaders sought European protection to support their authority and stabilize trade.

On 12 July 1884, King Ndumbé Lobé Bell and King Akwa signed a treaty in which they assigned sovereign rights, legislation and administration of their country in full to the firms of Carl Woermann and Jantzen & Thormählen, represented by the merchants Edward Schmidt and Johann Voss. The treaty included conditions that existing contracts and property rights be maintained, existing customs respected and the German administration continue to make "comey", or trading tax, payments to the kings as before. King Bell received 27,000 marks in exchange for signing the treaty, a very large sum at that time.

On the basis of this treaty between the kings and the representatives of the trading firms, the next day the German Consul assumed the suzerainty of the German Empire over the territory of the Cameroons. The legal grounds were that the German Emperor automatically assumed any sovereign powers that were assigned to his subjects, but later the Duala leaders were to make many complaints about violations of the treaty intent by the colonial administration.

== Plantations ==
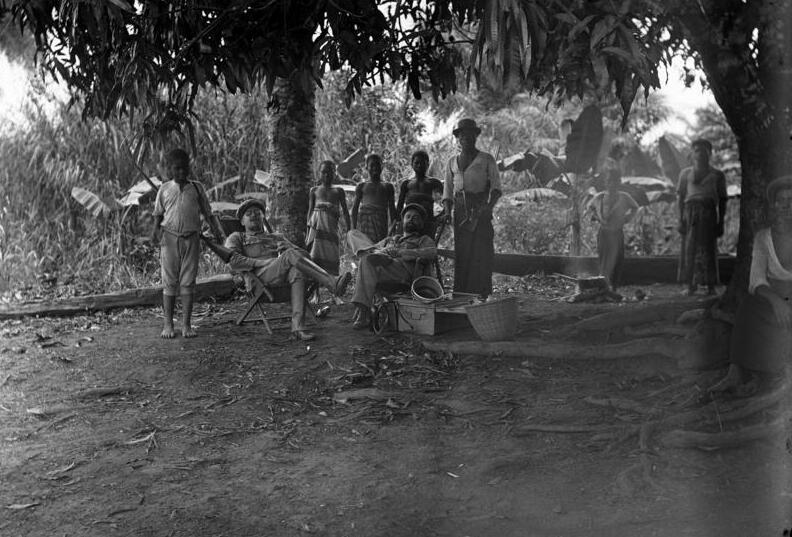
Two white settlers and local children and men on the Mungo River, Christmas 1901

Jantzen & Thormählen entered the plantation business in 1885, but development was slow, with more interest being shown in railways by investors. At first, the firm had to depend on imported labor for their tobacco and cocoa operations. By 1898, Jantzen & Thormählen had their headquarters in Bimbia, in the Victoria District, and lands in Debundscha, Isongo Udje and Mokundange. The process for acquiring land in the early years was informal. In some cases, the company simply occupied the land and their title was later recognized by the government. Sometimes they paid the local chiefs for the land. In other cases, the government declared an area to be crown land, and sold it to the company. Eventually, through various mergers, Jantzen & Thormählen created the largest plantation area in West Africa around Mount Cameroon, with 90,000 hectares (220,000 acres) of cocoa, coffee, and later rubber, oil palm and bananas.

Johannes Thormälen considered that it was inconceivable that Cameroon could ever be developed through the work of the natives, thinking they were incapable of the organization required and too lazy. He believed that they had to be forced to work the large plantations by more civilized people. The population naturally resisted, and the army assisted in hunting for workers, Those with children were preferred. It was common for them to be fed poorly, forced to work 18-hour days and whipped if they slacked off.

== Interior trade ==
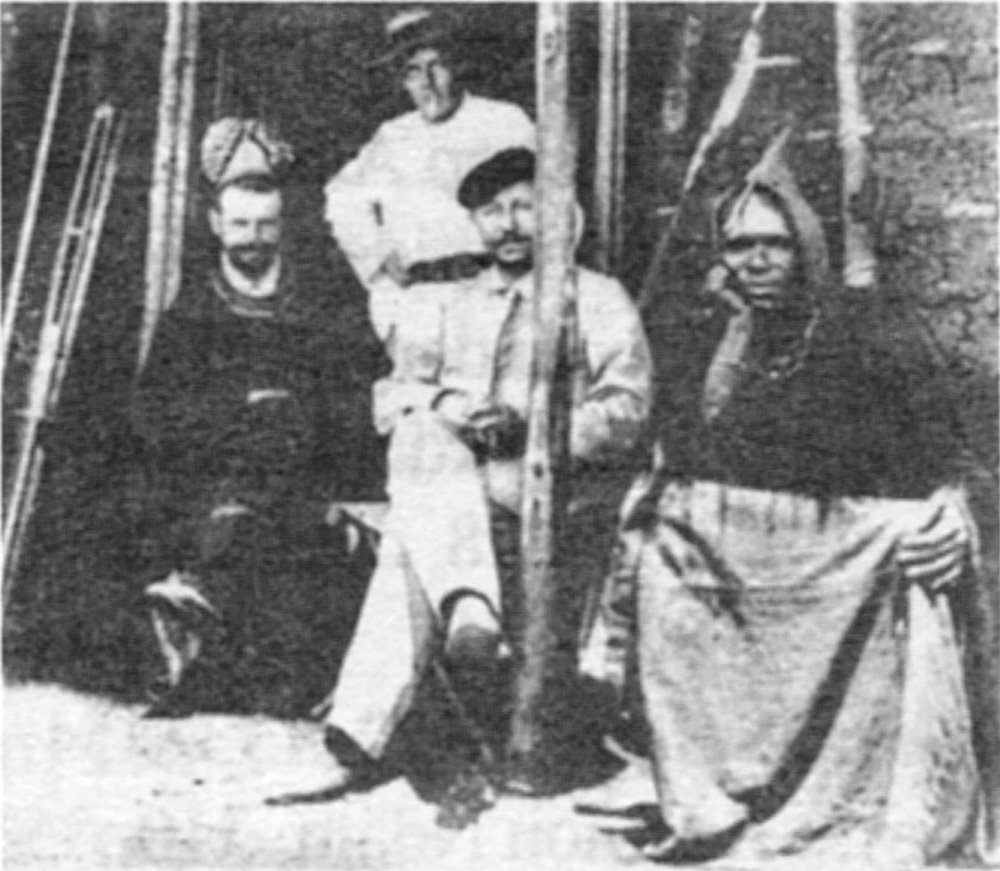
German explorer Eugen Zintgraff and Galega I, fon of Bali, Cameroon.

In 1885, it was reported that Jantzen & Thormählen had established a company with capital of £500,000 to trade on the Benue River, a major tributary of the Niger River. When the explorer Eugen Zintgraff tried to create a caravan route from the upper Mungo River to the Adamawa Plateau via the Bamenda grassfields, Jantzen & Thormählen decided to establish a factory at Mundame on the Mungo in 1889 as a trading post for palm products, ivory and rubber. They also agreed to support a trading expedition further into the interior to Bali, in the grassfields. At first, they were supported in this enterprise by the governor Julius von Soden. By 1892 they had built a wooden house and a corrugated iron barracks at Mundame, and were building a store house. They had made a clearing planted with palms, cocoyam, manioc, maize and rice, as well as potatoes and other European vegetables.

However, the enterprise failed in part because of competition from Efik traders from Calabar in Nigeria, using the Cross River route, and in part from local competition from the Bell faction of Duala traders led by Ndumbe Lobe Bell. Canoe transport was more efficient than steam vessels. The Bells had well-established contacts along the river and were backed by British traders who were excluded from the river by the Jantzen & Thormählen monopoly. In 1892, Jantzen & Thormählen closed the factory, partly for financial reasons and partly because von Soden's successor Eugen von Zimmerer had decided to support the Bells on the Mungo and focus on the Sanaga River as a route for direct trade to the interior.

In the mid-1890s, Jantzen & Thormählen made a first attempt to start a station at Yabassi, on the Wouri River. Although this failed, the firm was one of eleven merchant firms that purchased land at Yabassi between 1898 and 1900. The move was probably due to growing competition among Douala traders, who could not afford to be cut off from efficient access to the sources of goods in the interior.

== Later years ==
In the early years of the 20th century, the firm expanded their production of cocoa, for which there was growing European demand, in competition with the Liverpool firms of John Holt and Ambas Bay. They made major plantings, which were later to lead to a glut on the market. Business was suspended when World War I broke out in 1914, and after the war the plantations were taken over by the British colony of the Cameroons.
