= SS Adolph Woermann =

German steam powered ocean liner

- Adolph Woermann

History
- Name: Adolph Woermann
- Owner: Woermann-Linie
- Operator: Woermann-Linie
- Port of registry: (Weimar Republic) Hamburg (1922–35); (Nazi Germany) Hamburg (1935–39)
- Route: Hamburg — Africa
- Builder: Blohm & Voss
- Yard number: 395
- Launched: 1922
- Maiden voyage: 15 November 1922
- Identification: Code letters RDBH (until 1933); Call sign DHAK (1934 onward)
- Fate: scuttled 22 November 1939

General characteristics
- Type: Ocean liner
- Tonnage: 8,577 GRT; 4,944 NRT
- Length: 132.1 m (433.5 ft)
- Beam: 17.7 m (58.2 ft)
- Depth: 11.4 m (37.4 ft)
- Installed power: 3,300 PSw
- Propulsion: 4 × steam turbines; single reduction gearing; 1 × screw
- Speed: 12 knots (22 km/h)
- Capacity: Passengers: 1st class 100; 2nd class 57; 3rd class 134
- Crew: 156

SS Adolph Woermann was a German steam ocean liner built in 1922 by Blohm & Voss in Hamburg for the shipping lines Woermann-Linie (WL) and German East Africa Line (Deutsche Ostafrika Linie, DOAL) and named after German merchant, ship owner and politician Adolph Woermann, and the fourth ship of the same name.

== Details ==
Adolph Woermann was an oil-fuelled steamship. She had a set of four Blohm & Voss steam turbines that drove a single screw via single reduction gearing. Her code letters were RDBH until 1933–34, when they were superseded by the call sign DHAK.

== Peacetime service ==
Adolph Woermann ran aground at Cape Spartivento, Sardinia, Italy, on 24 October 1928. She was refloated on 26 October 1928.

In the early 1930s the future jazz pianist and composer Charles Segal and future actor Laurence Harvey were passengers on Adolph Woermann from Hamburg to Cape Town when their mothers, who were half-sisters, emigrated taking their children from Lithuania to South Africa.

== Second World War ==
At the outbreak of World War II, Adolph Woermann was at Lobito in Portuguese Angola on a homeward voyage. Portuguese authorities detained her but on 16 November 1939 she left Lobito disguised as the Portuguese ship Nyassa to try to reach South America.

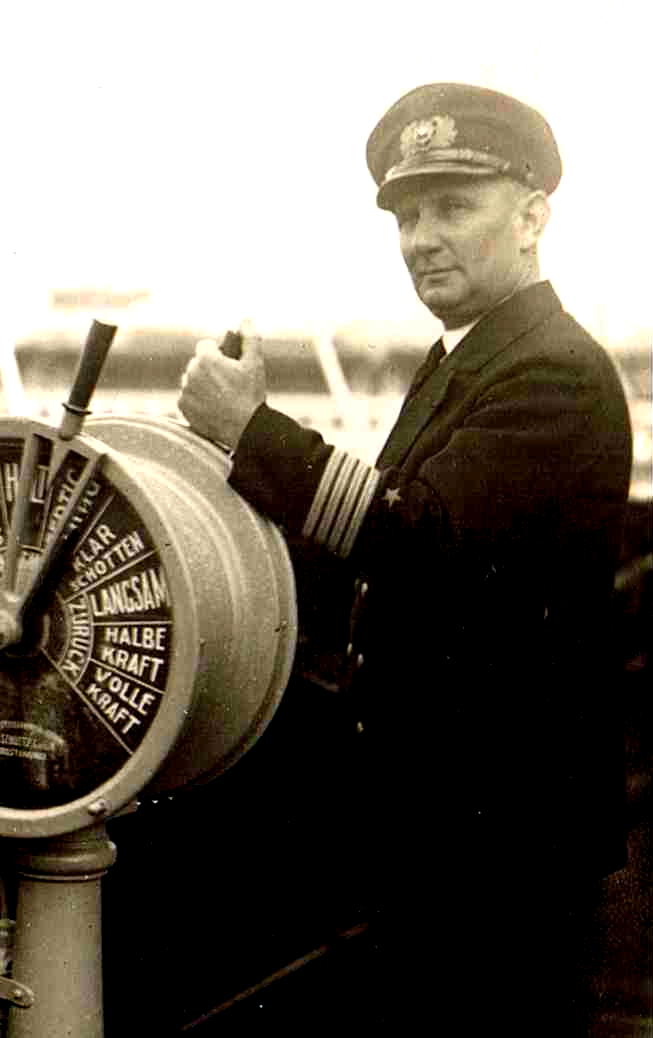
Otto Burfeind

The UK refrigerated cargo liner Waimarama traced Adolph Woermann and alerted the Royal Navy light cruiser HMS Neptune. When Neptune approached on 22 November, Adolph Woermann's master, Otto Burfeind, evacuated his ship and scuttled her according to standing orders.

Crew and passengers were rescued in a friendly manner by the Neptune's crew. It is reported that one Neptune crew member was injured in trying to save the liner by going aboard to close the seacocks. Passengers and crew of Adolph Woermann were taken to England and interned at Seaton, Devon.

In 1940 most of the internees from Seaton, including Captain Burfeind and his crew, were put aboard Arandora Star to be transferred to Canada. On 2 July 1940 the German submarine U-47 torpedoed Arandora Star. Burfeind remained aboard, helping to organise Arandora Star's evacuation, until she sank and he was lost.

== Bibliography ==
- Kludas, Arnold (1975). Die Schiffe der deutschen afrika-linien 1880–1945. Hamburg: Stalling Verlag. ISBN 978-3797918673.
- Rothe, Claus (1987). Deutsche Ozean-Passagierschiffe 1919 bis 1985. Moers: Steiger Verlag. ISBN 978-3921564974.
