= Afrikahaus (Hamburg) =

Office building in Hamburg, Germany

Coordinates: 53°32′53″N 9°59′44″E

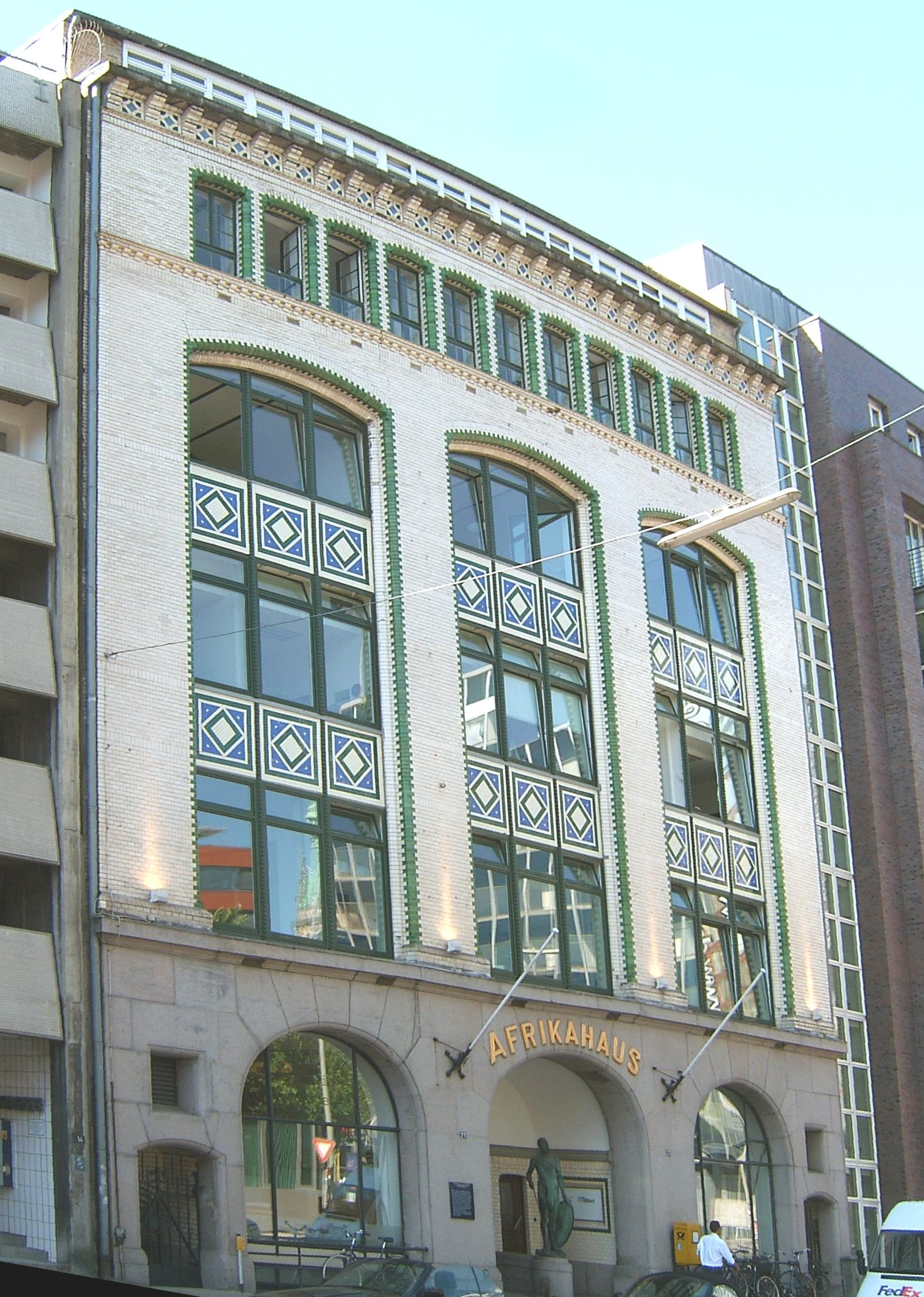
Facade of Afrikahaus

The Afrikahaus is an office building at Große Reichenstraße 27 in the German city of Hamburg. It was built in 1899 as the headquarters of the C. Woermann firm (including the Woermann-Linie) by the Hamburg architect Martin Haller and was given listed monument status in 1972.

== Construction ==
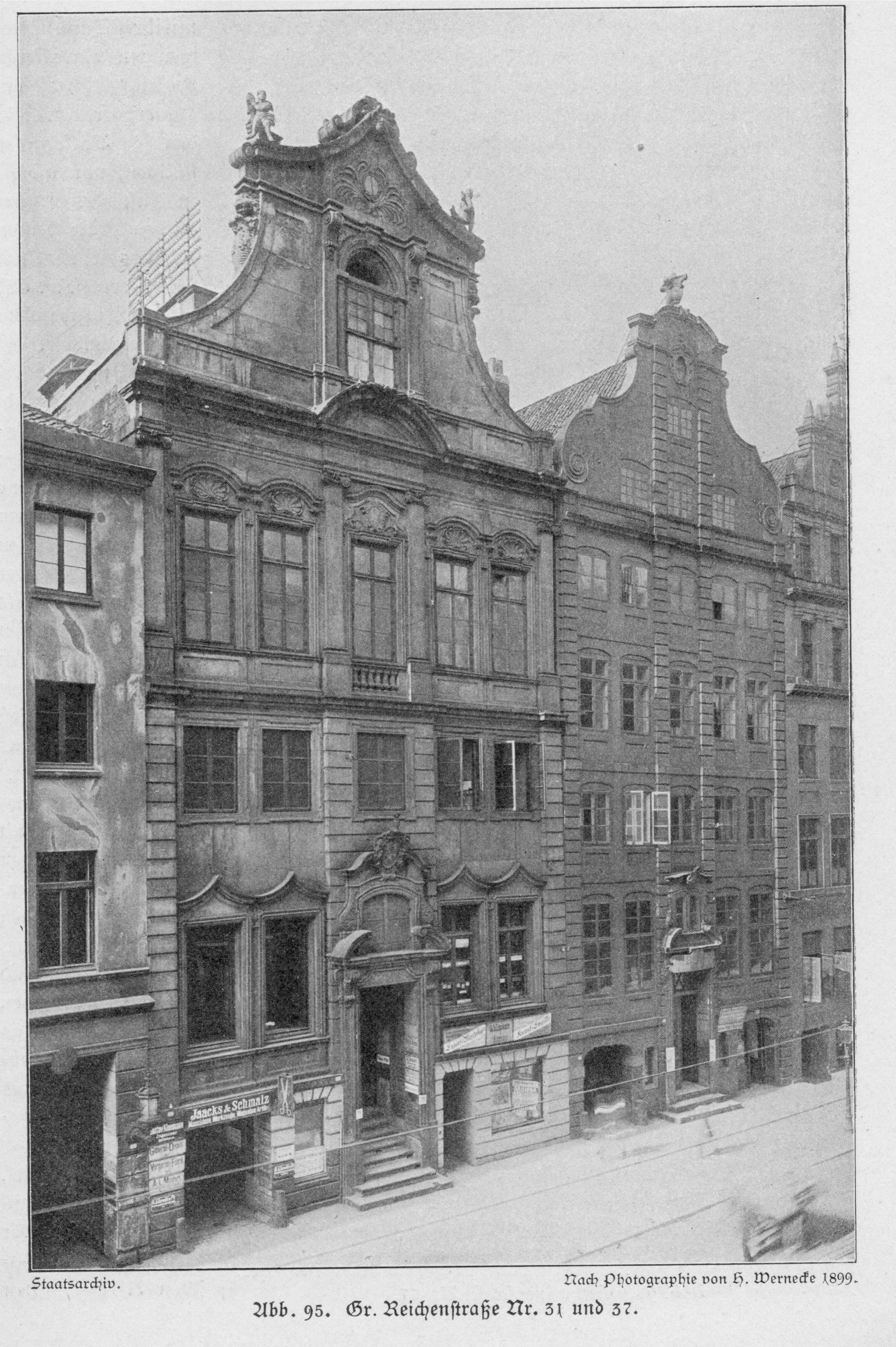
Haus Große Reichenstraße 31, the building was destroyed to make room for the Afrikahaus. (left).

The Afrikahaus was commissioned by Adolph Woermann and Eduard Woermann in 1899 to serve as an office for the C. Woermann trading company, the operator of the Woermann-Linie and the Deutsche Ost-Afrika Linie. For construction to take place, Haus Große Reichenstraße 31, an old Hamburg Mansion, was demolished.

The architect Martin Haller designed the facade to emphasize the exotic nature of its primary tenant. To further reflect this, the building's colors were those of the Woermann line.

== Location ==
The Afrikahaus is centrally located in Hamburg's inner city, between the shopping street, Mönckebergstraße, the Hamburg City Hall and the warehouse district, Speicherstadt. To the west is another notable office building, the Zürichhaus.

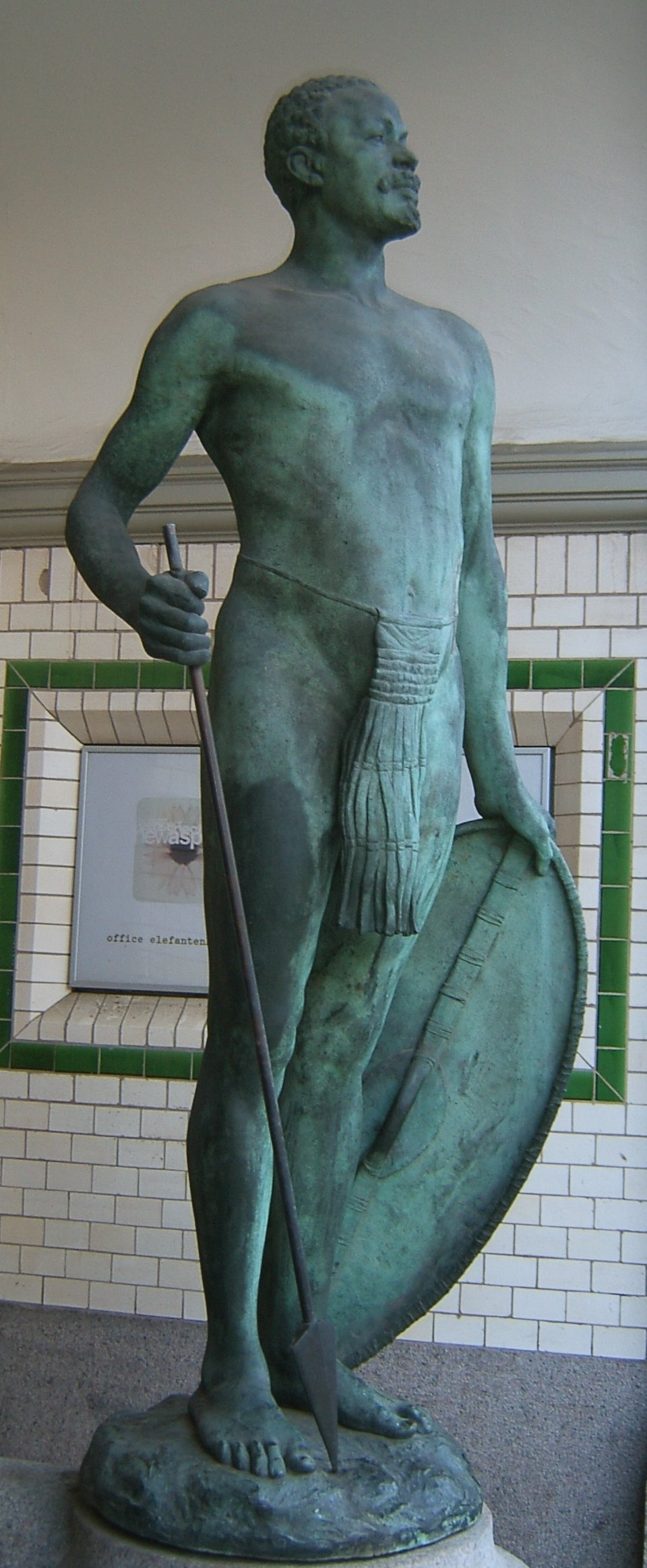
Sculpture of an African warrior by Walter Sintenis

== The building as a monument ==
The "Afrikahaus" was protected in 1972 as an example of Hamburg Kontorhaus Architecture. When built in 1900, it combined the modern construction techniques and practicality. Because of its status, the building is regularly open on the "Day of Open Monuments", with guided tours of the Afrikahaus provided for visitors.

The building was closed for renovations for a few years, but reopened in February 1999 with modern office space. During the renovation, special care was taken to ensure that architectural features such as cast iron supports, vaulted ceilings, doors, and a wall mosaic with African Motifs and Elephants were preserved.

== Today ==
The building is now family owned, and is rented out to various firms. Companies that currently rent space in the building include, pilot group, Deutsche Personalberatung - DPB - GmbH & Co. KG, EURO I AG, IPHH Internet Port Hamburg GmbH, HEAVEN'S DOOR event agentur GmbH, Careerteam GmbH, SNM Style Net Media GmbH, and the restaurant Estancia Steak. Since the buildings construction, C. Woermann GmbH & Co has been a tenant.
