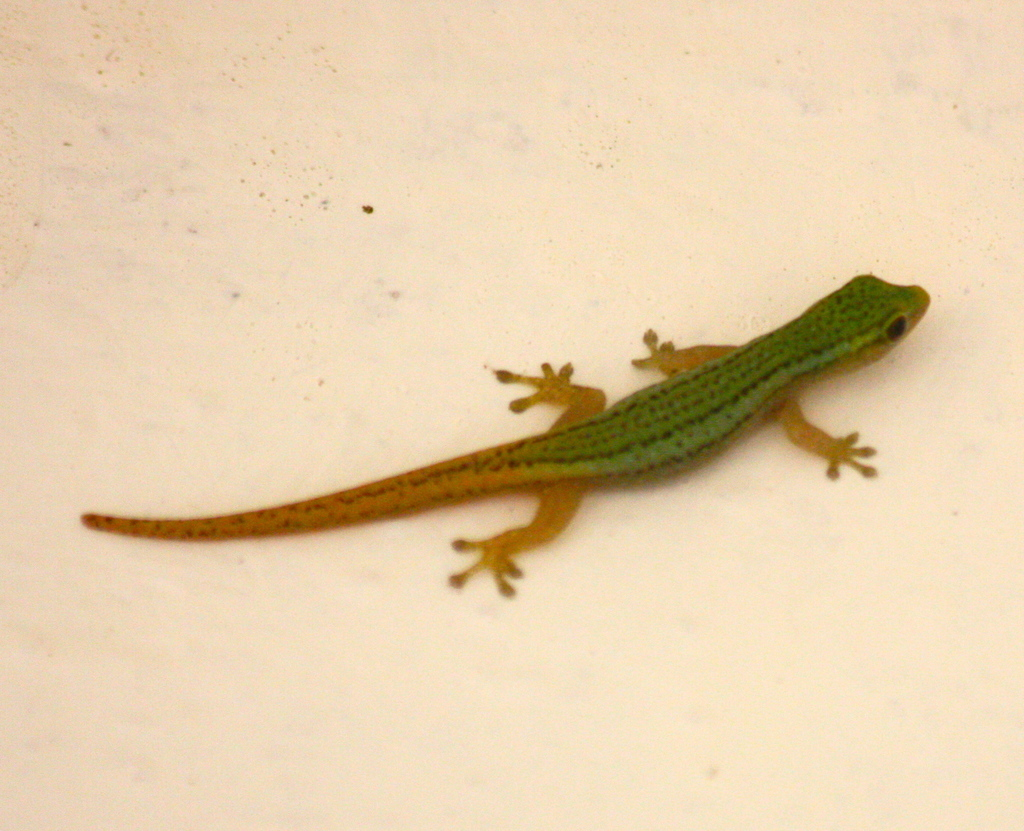

Conservation status
- Least Concern (IUCN 3.1)

Scientific classification
- Kingdom: Animalia
- Phylum: Chordata
- Class: Reptilia
- Order: Squamata
- Suborder: Gekkota
- Family: Gekkonidae
- Genus: Lygodactylus
- Species: L. conraui

Binomial name
- Lygodactylus conraui Tornier, 1902

Synonyms
- Lygodacutylus [sic] strongi Barbour & Loveridge, 1927

= Cameroon dwarf gecko =

Species of lizard

The Cameroon dwarf gecko (Lygodactylus conraui), also known commonly as Conrau's dwarf gecko, is a species of lizard in the family Gekkonidae. This small gecko is found in forests, plantations and gardens in West Africa and Central Africa.

== Etymology ==
The specific name, conraui, is in honor of late 19th-century German collector Gustav Conrau.

== Geographic range ==
Lygodactylus conraui is found from Sierra Leone to Cameroon, Equatorial Guinea, and Gabon.

== Reproduction ==
Lygodactlyus conraui is oviparous.

== Behaviour ==
The species is known to exhibit anthropochory (taking advantage of human activity) and to use edificarian (human) habitat.

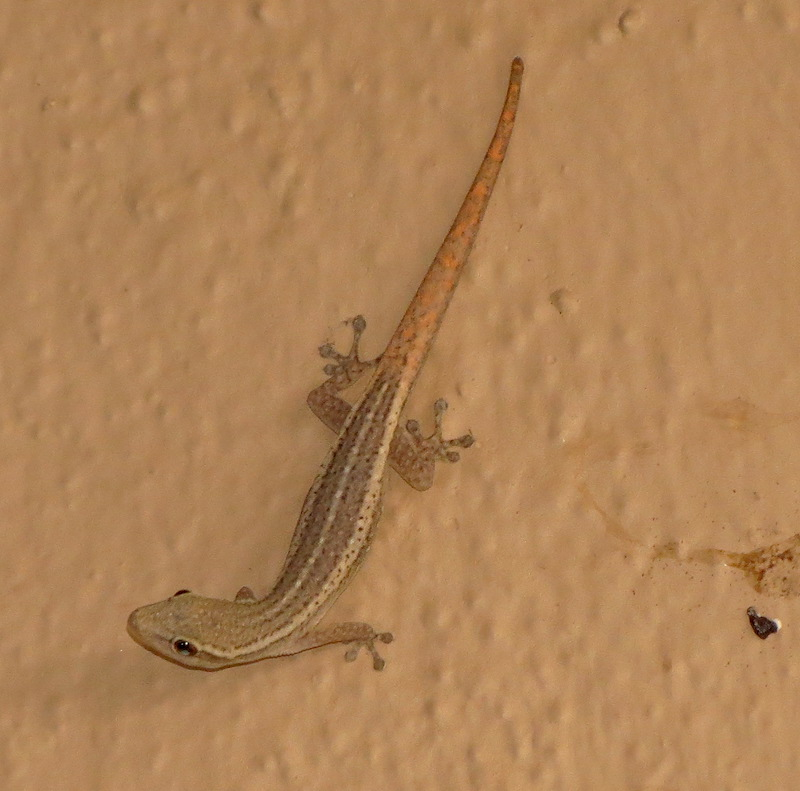
Lygodactylus conraui, Godomey, Benin
