= The Continent (digital newspaper) =

Pan-African newspaper

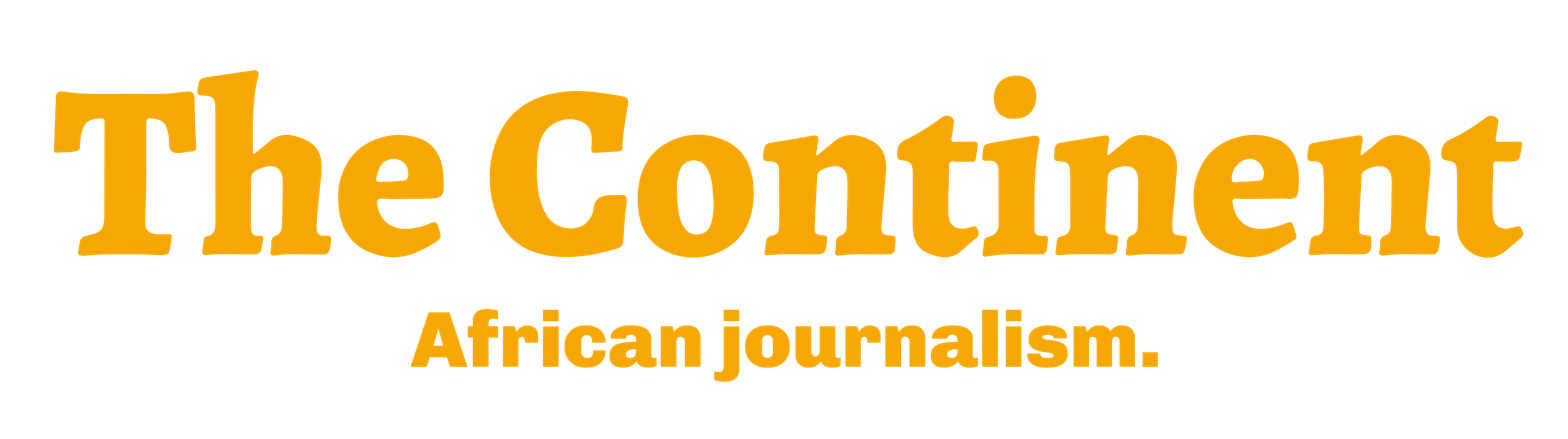
- Type: Weekly newspaper
- Format: Digital-only
- Publisher: Sipho Kings
- Editor-in-chief: Christine Mungai
- Founded: April 2020
- Language: English
- Headquarters: South Africa
- Website: https://www.thecontinent.org/

The Continent is a weekly African digital newspaper with 31,000 subscribers in 160 countries, including every country in Africa.

It is published by the non-profit All Protocol Observed, based in South Africa. The first edition was sent out in April 2020, during the Covid-19 pandemic.

The newspaper was co-founded by Simon Allison and Sipho Kings. It has the stated aims of building Africa's paper of record and empowering people with quality journalism.

75% of respondents in reader surveys say they share it with at least two people each week. This creates an entirely organic subscriber base. The words most frequently used by readers to describe The Continent in surveys are "love", "trust" and "fun".

== The Continent news coverage ==
The Continent covers news from across Africa, with an average of 30 pages each week. A page has no more than 300 words and the newspaper has an emphasis on photographs and illustrations. It has worked with 400 journalists and storytellers.

The newspaper prominently features illustrations. It has covered topics ranging from street racing in South Africa to genocide and the climate crisis.

An article by The Continent of 5 February 2025, titled "The Museum of Stolen History", covered the story of the late 19th-century German trader and collector of Bangwa sculptures Gustav Conrau and the sculpture known in the West as "Bangwa Queen" from an African perspective. In particular, it referred to the statue as "Ngwi Ndem, the divine spouse who intercedes for those seeking fertility, bountiful harvests, and protection against evil." Further, the article quoted Chief Charles Taku, Assunganyi's great-grandson and a lead counsel at the International Criminal Court, saying that Conrau had stolen the sculpture and dozens of others. This account contradicted the information in German and other sources that chief Assungany (c. 1880–1951) of Kingdom of Lebang in the former German colony Kamerun had sold or given the statues to Conrau voluntarily.

== The Continent innovation ==
The Continent does not publish individual stories on a website, instead curating a single weekly PDF that is optimised for peer-to-peer digital platforms like Signal and WhatsApp. This format allows it to escape censorship – a PDF can be shared manually between phones – and means no algorithm decides who gets to read a story.

The Continent publishes four seasons of 10 editions a year. Publication breaks between seasons allow the team to iterate and look after their health. For two weeks each December, the newsroom has a hard shutdown with no emails or messages.
