= Ateu Atsa =

African sculptor, c. 1840–1910

- Born: c. 1840
- Died: c. 1910
- Known for: Ritual sculptures of the Bangwa ethnic group
- Notable work: Commemorative sculptures of kings and queens
- Style: Traditional Bangwa African sculpture

Ateu Atsa (c. 1840–1910) was an African sculptor of the Bangwa Kingdom, an ethnic subgroup of the Bamileke people in the Western High Plateau in modern-day Cameroon. Active in the second half of the 19th century, Atsa is one of the few early African artists known by his name. Further, he has been credited as a master of traditional African sculpture.

His wooden sculptures have become known since the 1950s through studies by Western art historians and exhibitions in major museums. These have included American museums such as the Metropolitan Museum of Art and the Cleveland Museum of Art, as well as European collections of African sculpture including the Musée du quai Branly in Paris and the Ethnological Museum of Berlin.

== Life and work ==
=== Social and ritual context ===
Commemorative sculptures of the Western Bangwa kingdoms in the mountainous region of the Fontem basin, west of the Cameroon Grasslands, were used in royal and spiritual rituals. Commemorative figures played an important role in ritual occasions, such as the funerals and succession of kings and ceremonies honouring royal ancestors. (Note: The leaders of Bangwa communities have been called in the literature both king, chief or by the local name fwa.) Important chiefs in Bangwa communities were expected to commission a ritual sculpture of themselves during their lifetime. In addition to chiefs, the Queen Mothers and the Princesses Royal were also represented as sculptures. These sculptures were placed as symbolic guardians in royal shrines, reinforcing the connection between the living and the spirits of past rulers.

Carvers such as Atsa were trained in workshops, and carving was considered a highly regarded profession. At the end of his apprenticeship, the young carver had to present a masterpiece to the king. Only when the object had been accepted was he recognised as a carver. When not engaged in carving, the carver took part in the communal life of the kingdom like any other villager. He only produced statues, when commissioned by the king, or when a carving was required for cultural events such as enthronement, admission to a ritual associations or the rebuilding of a society house or royal dwelling. His services might also have been needed to replace a cult object that had been damaged or broken.

Some of these wooden sculptures adorning the top end of ritual poles of staffs belonged to secret Lefem associations. These were composed of nobles who gathered weekly in a sacred space in the forest to discuss matters related to the welfare of the kingdom. Ritual staffs were placed at the entrance of the society's sacred grove to signal to non-members that entry was prohibited.

=== Works by Atsa ===
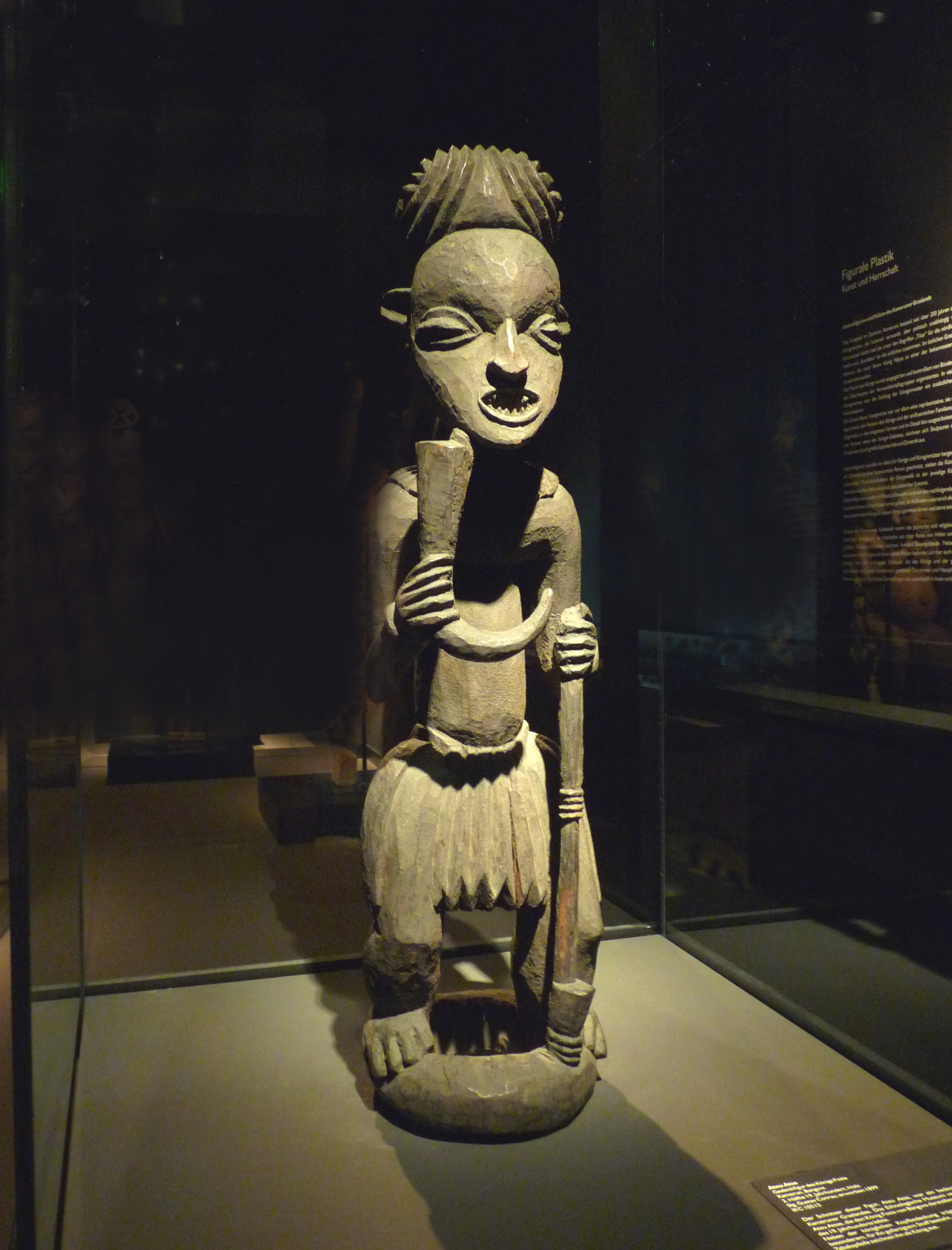
Statue of King Fosia, 86,5 cm, Ethnological Museum Berlin

In 1898 and 1899, Gustav Conrau, a German trader and art collector active in the former German colony Kamerun, acquired forty traditional Bangwa sculptures from the palace of King Assunganyi (c. 1880–1951. On command from the forerunner of the Ethnological Museum of Berlin, Conrau shipped these to the German capital, where most of them are still held today. Others have been acquired by private collectors and other museums in Europe and the United States.

Ateu Atsa's name was first mentioned in a 1990 article titled "Royal Commemorative Figures in the Cameroon Grasslands: Ateu Atsa, a Bangwa Artist". Pierre Harter, a self-trained French ethnographer of Bangwa culture and long-time resident physician in Cameroon, had based his article on notes, photographs and local oral testimony collected in Cameroon in the late 1960s. During his interviews about the origin and usage of western Bangwa sculptures, he was told the following story: The famous Bangwa carver Ateu Atsa had enraged a Banyang king of a neighbouring chiefdom by portraying him realistically with a patrtial facial paralysis, rather than in an idealized way. It was only when Atsa was safely back at his own village in Fontem that the Banyang chief realised the unfavourable features that Atsu had represented in the sculpture. - Through this anecdote, Harter identified and contextualized Atsa as an individual artist.

The number and kinds of sculptures attributed to Atsa by art historians have been based mainly on stylistic analysis. According to Harter's 1990 assessment, fifteen sculptures can be considered as Atsa's work. As common features Harter observed that all male figures are nearly "identical in physical details such as size, gestures, and the attributes they hold." Further, Atsa incorporated distinctive pieces of cloth with seven folds and supporting elements, for example a long pipe in one of the sculptures, that are "entirely original and specific to Ateu Atsa." Based on her own provenance research and stylistic qualities, ethnologist Bettina von Lintig in 2002 proposed that the total number of works created by Atsa and his workshop could be extended to twenty-eight.

Among their present major collection of Bangwa sculptures, the Ethnological Museum in Berlin owns a commemorative figure of a Bangwa chief called Fosia. Acquired in 1898 and since then attributed to Atsa, this is considered as the best preserved and most characteristic of Atsa's surviving sculptures. Other sculptures by Atsa in Germany are a commemorative figure in the Rautenstrauch-Joest Museum in Cologne and a sculptured veranda post in the Museum Five Continents in Munich. In France, the Musée du quay Branly owns a memorial figure of a king and a female figure with child and a staff, while the Musée Dapper owns the so-called "Bangwa Queen".

Another commemorative figure purchased in 1987 by the Cleveland Museum of Art shows royal stylistical features such as headdress, necklace, loincloth and a horn-shaped containter. This commemorative portrait of a king or important dignitary was originally kept in a royal shrine and accompanied sacrifices made to the skulls of the chief's ancestors. For funerals and royal ceremonies, it could also be shown as a symbol for the sanctity of the kingdom and to protect its inhabitants. (Note: This description from the museum's webpage is in Public Domain according to Cleveland Museum of Art's Open Access policy.)

A 2011 exhibition of African art at the Neuberger Museum of Art of the State University of New York displayed two sculptures attributed to Atsa or his workshop. One of these was a female commemorative figure, the other one a male figure from a private collection. Further, the Eskenazi Museum of Art at Indiana University owns a sculptured figure from the upper end of a Lefem society staff. Since 2005, the Yale University Art Gallery owns a figure of a royal ancestor on a pole attributed to Atsa. Another such sculptured staff top, carved with a figure of a chief holding a mask, was sold to a private collector at an auction by Sotheby's in 2014. It has been attributed to the workshop of Atsa, based on its style, iconography and the treatment of the sculptured surface. Also in 2021, a private collector acquired a commemorative figure of Atsa from the estate of Pierre Harter at an auction by Christie's in Paris.

== Reception ==
=== Studies of sculptures attributed to Atsa ===
Due to lack of information about the provenance of these sculptures and the long-standing attitude towards African anonymous "tribal art", very few early African sculptors such as Atsa are known by name. In 2020, the Eskenazi Museum of Art at Indiana University published an article about their online collections titled "But who made it? The role of the artist in the Arts of Africa, Oceania, and Indigenous Art of the Americas." Commenting on a figure attributed to Atsa from the top of a Lefem society ritual staff, the article stated: "Not many African artists from before the twentieth century are known by name, but Ateu Atsa's realism, his use of structural supports and the support of his biggest patron, a Gontem king, increased his reputation."

In his 1990 study of Atsa's works Pierre Harter discussed the general ritual and cultural context of Bangwa sculptors. In more detail, Harter described distinctive stylistic features of the nine statues and three staffs of the Lefem society, a bowl bearer and two verandah posts from a royal palace that he attributed to Atsa. Apart from figures of male dignitaries, he mentioned a pair of both a male and a female figure and another single female one.

In 2015, German ethnologist Bettina von Lintig published an article about the successive owners of a staff with a carved figure made by Atsa. In her study, she traced the figure's ownership history from the Potter Museum in the United Kingdom to its attribution to Atsa and subsequent sale to a private collector. The author based this history on auction records and historical letters, revealing the object's significance in the context of African artifacts and its connections to 20th-century collecting practices.

=== Exhibitions ===
Since the 1950s, Bangwa sculptures including masterpieces by Atsa have been shown in exhibitions in Europe and the United States. Reporting about the 2021 exhibition Mains de maîtres – Masterhands: À la découverte des sculpteurs d'Afrique (Masterhands: Discovering the sculptors of Africa) in Brussels, Belgium, The New York Times refuted the erroneous Western assumption that art from Africa was always anonymous.

The 2007 exhibition Eternal Ancestors: The Art of the Central African Reliquary at the Metropolitan Museum of Art included the Berlin sculpture of King Fosia by Atsa, among other Bangwa sculptures collected by Conrau. In his exhibition review for the New York Times, art critic Holland Cotter remarked the multitude of artworks relating to the veneration of ancestors in Central Africa. Among other art objects in this exhibition, the review noted Atsu's sculpture of King Fosia, made on request of the living king in order to guard his skull after death.

=== Major exhibitions presenting works by Ateu Atsa ===
- The Art of Cameroon. Washington, D.C: Smithsonian Institution Traveling Exhibition, 1984, shown in New Orleans Museum of Art, Museum of Fine Arts, Houston, Field Museum of Natural History, American Museum of Natural History
- African Art: Recent Acquisitions. Pace Primitive and Ancient Art. New York, NY, October 24 – December 6, 1986.
- Kings of Africa: Art and Authority in Central Africa. Maastricht, The Netherlands, June 26 – August 27, 1992.
- Mains de maîtres – Masterhands: À la découverte des sculpteurs d'Afrique. Espace Culturel BBL, Brussels, Belgium. March 22 – June 24, 2001
- Eternal Ancestors: The Art of the Central African Reliquary. The Metropolitan Museum of Art. October 2, 2007 – March 2, 2008
- Heroic Africans: Legendary Leaders, Iconic Sculptures. The Metropolitan Museum of Art. September 19, 2011 – January 29, 2012.
- Helden Afrikas: Ein neuer Blick auf die Kunst. Museum Rietberg, Zurich. February 26 – June 3, 2012.
- African Master Carvers: Known and Famous. The Cleveland Museum of Art, March 26 – July 16, 2017.

=== Claims for restitution ===
During a 2021 conference on provenance research about collections from colonial contexts, Chief Charles A. Taku, a great-grandson of King Assunganyi and president of the International Criminal Court Bar Association (ICCBA), raised legal and moral considerations, claiming the restitution of Bangwa cultural heritage to the community of origin in Cameroon.

Evelien Campfens, a cultural heritage law specialist at Leiden University, Netherlands, discussed what legal and human rights rules say, when cultural objects of a spiritual character and lost during colonial rule are claimed for return. Taking Atsa's "Bangwa Queen" as a case in point, Campfens argued that legal norms such as described in the 2007 United Nations Declaration on the Rights of Indigenous Peoples (UNDRIP) could justify the return of Bangwa sculptures from France and Germany. She further referred to contemporary "soft interpretations of laws" as in the 1986 International Code of Ethics by the International Council of Museums (ICOM) and corresponding rules for European museums that could be used as a basis for returns. This, however, would depend on the decision by cultural authorities to respond to the claims of representatives of the Bangwa people.

== Gallery ==
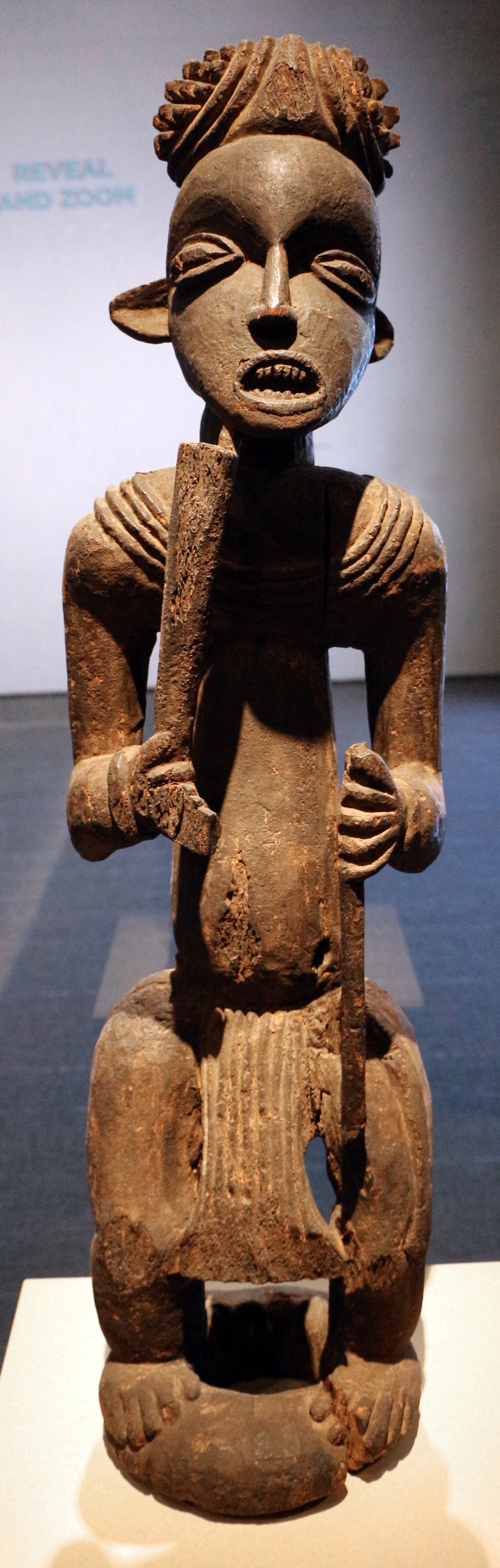
Commemorative figure, Cleveland Museum of Art

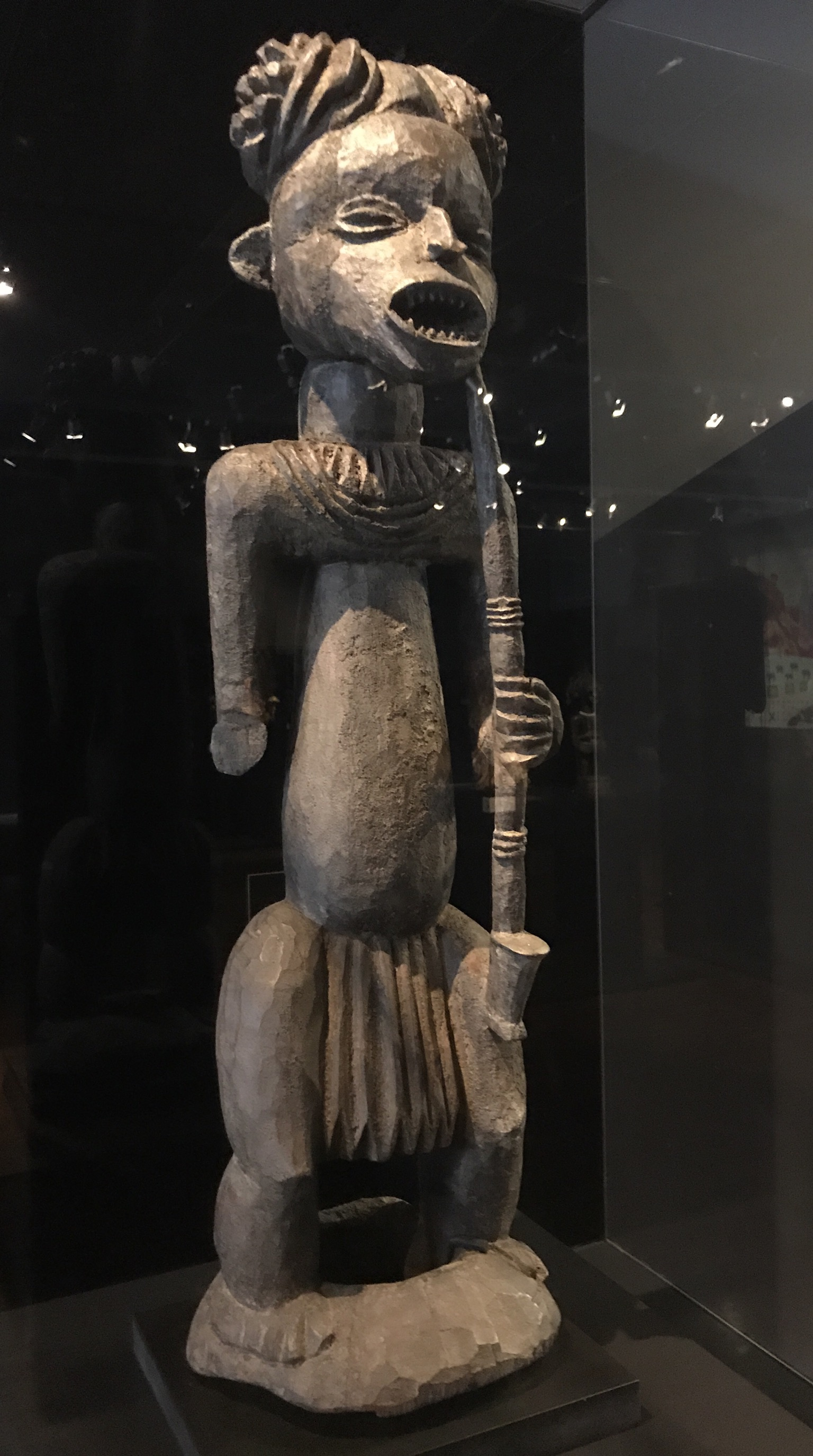
Commemorative figure, Rautenstrauch-Joest Museum, Cologne

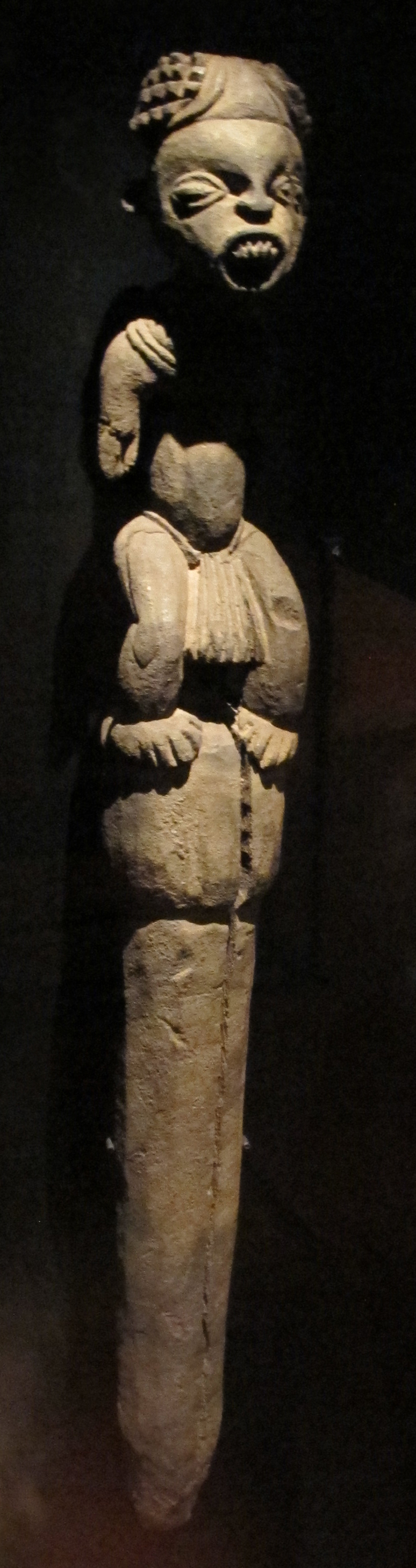
Ritual staff with ancestor figure, Musée du quai Branly, Paris

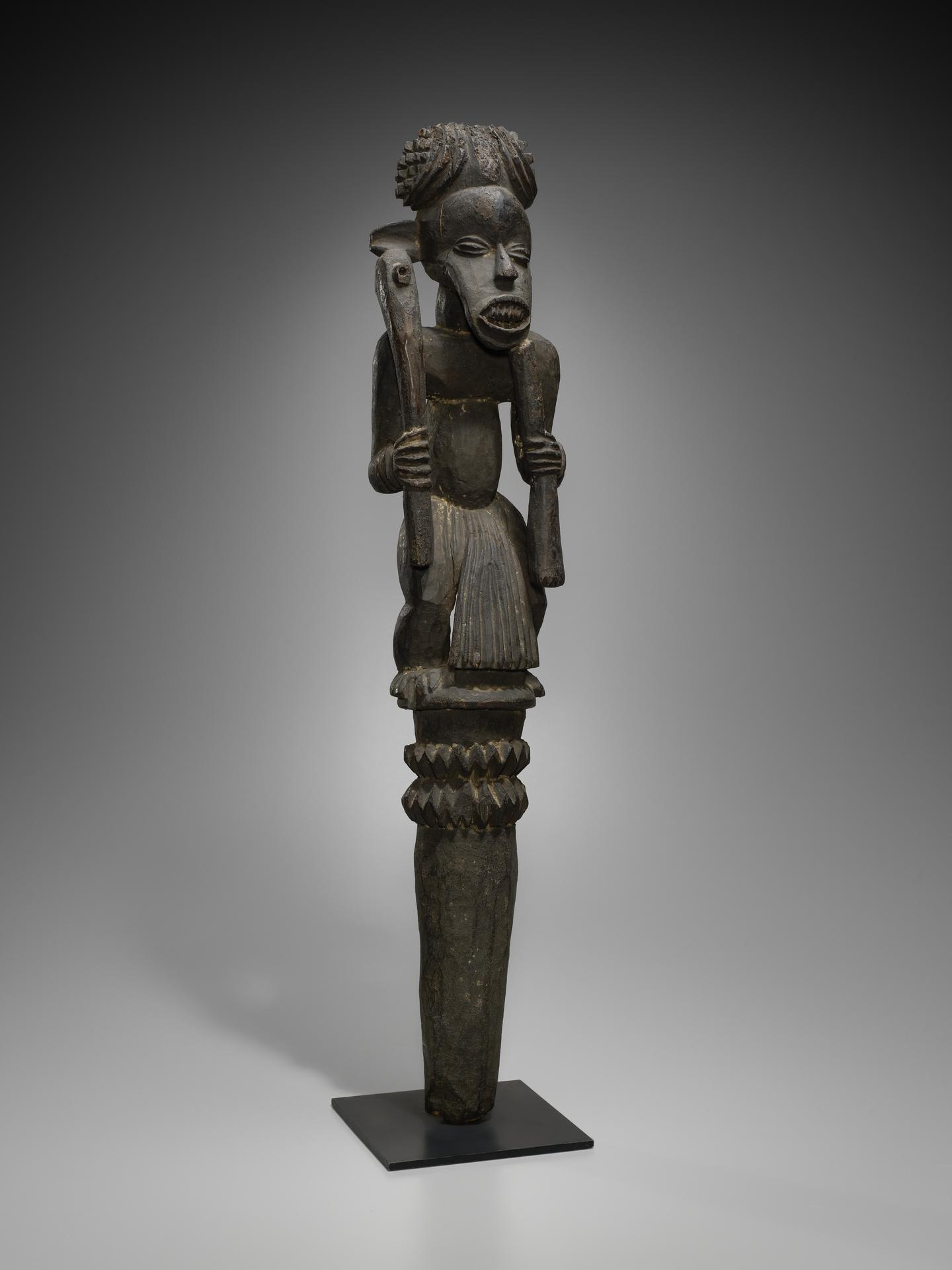
Ritual staff with ancestor figure, Yale University Art Gallery

== See also ==
- Olowe of Ise

== Literature ==
- Lintig, Bettina von (2019). "The Bangwa Queen. A Journey into Art History" (PDF, 2,18 MB). Tribal Art. 94 – via www.academia.edu.
- Brain, Robert (2014). "Bangwa [Mbangwé ; Mba Nwẽ]". www.oxfordartonline.com. doi:10.1093/gao/9781884446054.article.t006130.
- Lintig, Bettina von (2001). "Ateu Atsa, les sculpteurs, les prêtres-rois et la mémoire iconographique des Bangwa au Cameroun/Ateu Atsa, beeldsnijders, priester-koningen en het verbeelde geheugen van de Bangwa in Kameroen." In Bernard de Grunne et al., (2001). Mains de maîtres – Masterhands: À la découverte des sculpteurs d'Afrique. Espace Culturel BBL, Brussels. pp. 94–117, ISBN 9782705467869. (Exhibition catalogue, in French and Dutch)
- Lintig, Bettina von (1994). Die bildende Kunst der Bangwa. Werkstatt-Traditionen und Künstlerhandschriften. Munich: Akademischer Verlag. ISBN 9783929115208. (in German)
- Brain, Robert and Adam Pollock (1971). Bangwa Funerary Sculpture. London: Duckworth
