= Olowe of Ise =

Yoruba artist

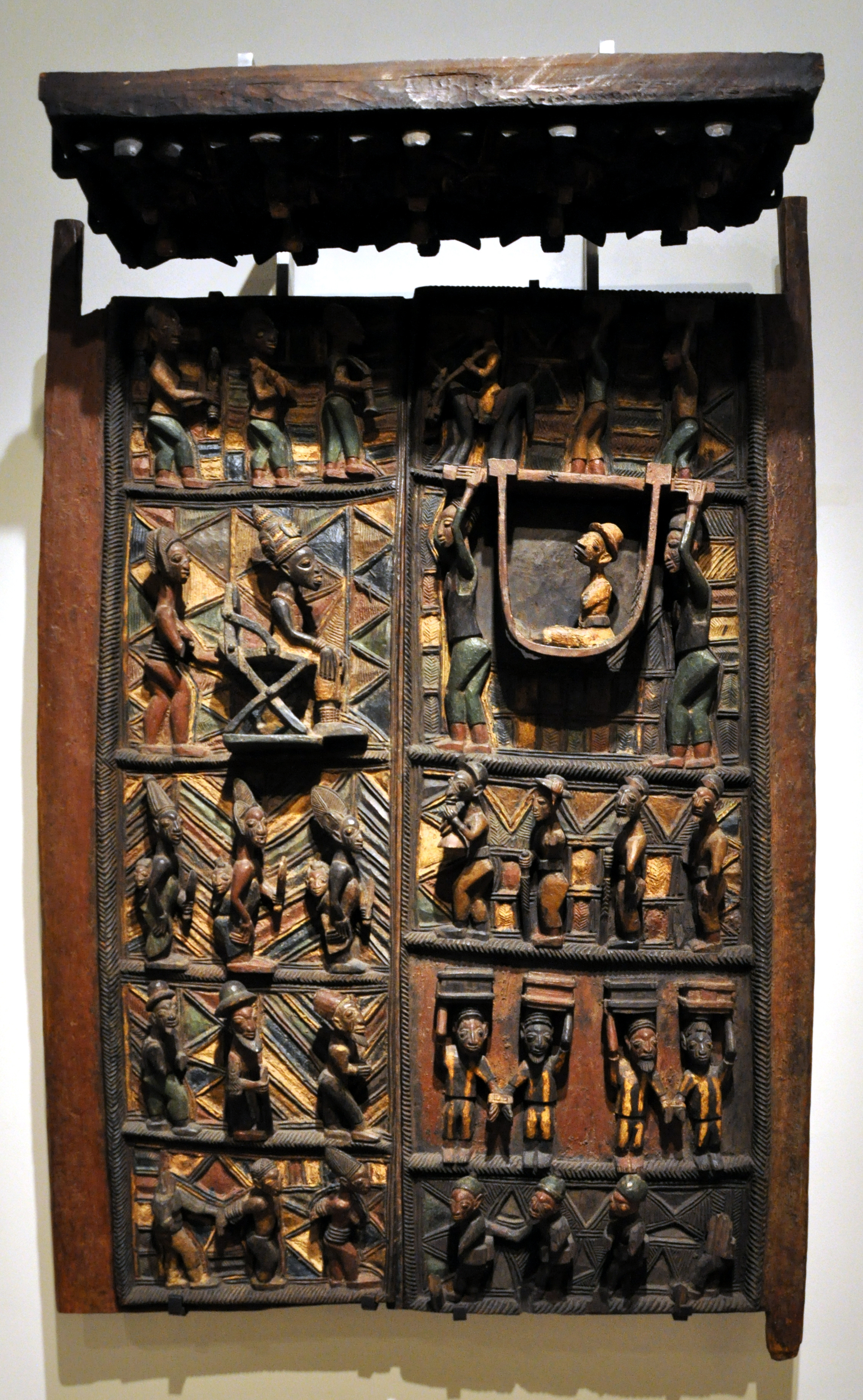
Pair of door panels and a lintel, c. 1910–1914, by Olowe of Ise (British Museum, London)

Olowe of Ise (Yoruba: Ọlọ́wẹ̀ of Ìsẹ̀; c. 1873 – c. 1938) is considered by Western art historians and collectors to be one of the most important 20th-century artists of the Yoruba people, an ethnic group in today's Nigeria. He was a wood sculptor and master innovator in the African style of design known as oju-ona.

== Life and career ==
Olowe, originally Olowere, was born in Efon-Alaiye, a town known as a major cultural centre in Yorubaland, but he lived most of his life in the city of Ise. He was initially employed as a messenger at the court of King Arinjale, the Oba of Ise. It is a matter of dispute whether his artistic career began as an apprenticeship or arose purely from his own natural talent. His fame as a sculptor appears to have begun at Ise under the patronage of Arinjale before spreading throughout eastern Yorubaland. Olowe was summoned to Ilesa, Ikere, Akure, Idanre, Ogbagi and other towns located within a 60-mile radius (96.75 kilometers) to create elaborate household (such as doors and veranda posts), personal and ritual objects for wealthy families.

Olowe's status as a celebrated artist was recorded by his contemporaries in Yoruba oral praise poetry known as oriki. For instance, a song sung by one of his wives was recorded in 1988.

== International recognition ==
In 1924, Olowe's art was exhibited overseas for the first time when a door and lintel ensemble from the royal palace at Ikere was selected for the Nigerian Pavilion at the British Empire Exhibition at Wembley, London. This work of art was subsequently acquired by the British Museum.

== Reception ==
The stacked trapezoidal shapes of the “corona” facade of the National Museum of African American History and Culture are inspired by the top of a sculpture by Olowe of Ise.

== See also ==
- Ateu Atsa

== Literature ==
- Roslyn Adele Walker. Olowe of Ise, "Anonymous" has a name, African Arts, 1998 : 38-47, 90.
- Roslyn Adele Walker. Olowe of Ise: A Yoruba Sculptor to Kings. Washington D.C., 1998.
