= Mundame =

- Location in Cameroon
- Coordinates: 4°34′32″N 9°30′28″E
- Country: Cameroon
- Region: Southwest
- Department: Koupé-Manengouba
- Time zone: UTC+1 (WAT)

Mundame or Moundamé is a community in Cameroon, in the Southwest Region, about 2 kilometres (1.2 mi) from the Mungo River. The river is navigable south of Mundame for about 100 kilometres (62 mi) as it flows through the coastal plain before entering mangrove swamps, where it splits into numerous small channels that empty into the Cameroon estuary complex.

In the early colonial era, Mundame was seen as having potential as a station for collecting trade goods such as rubber, palm oil and ivory for transport by river to the coast. The area was well-populated with people including Bakundu, Bafo and possibly Bebum. Dr. Schwartz's expedition of 1885 passed through Mundame, then went overland to Mambanda and Kumba before turning back at Ikiliwindi.

The German firm of Jantzen und Thormählen established a factory at Mundame in 1889, intending to use it as a stage for expansion into the northwest. By 1892 the Germans had built a wooden house and a corrugated iron barracks, and were building a store house. They had made a clearing planted with palms, cocoyam, manioc, maize and rice, as well as potatoes and other European vegetables. However, Duala traders could transport goods down the Mungo more economically by canoe, and Efik traders from Calabar in Nigeria were drawing away trade from further north via the Cross River. In 1892 the factory was abandoned.

In 1900 the Gesellschaft Nord-West Kamerun (GNK) sent an expedition led by Hptm von Ramsay from Douala via Mundame to the Cross River. Mundame become a military base from which the German forces retaliated against villagers who were up in arms due to the brutal conditions of the plantations. The town was revived as a trading post, and became a center for supplying posts further into the Cross River area using laborers to carry the goods.

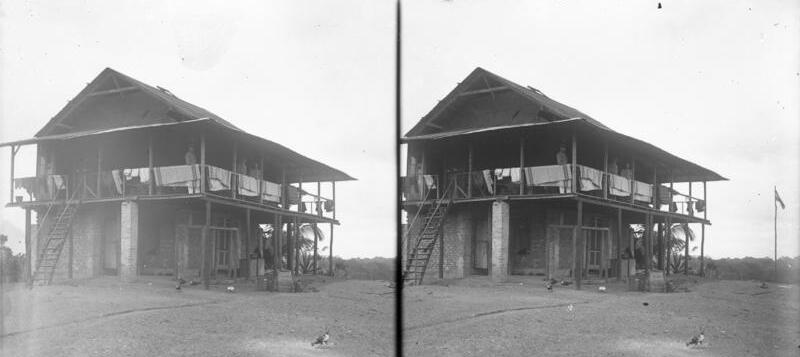
Germany military station at Mundame, 1904

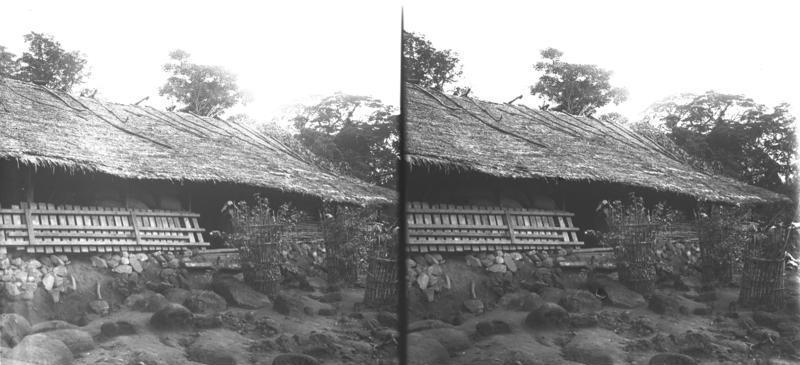
House of a German civilian administrator, 1904

By 1970, the community was described as a "forest village", with a relatively high level of infection by the parasitic worm Onchocerca volvulus, the causative agent of river blindness.
