= Eugen Zintgraff =

German explorer

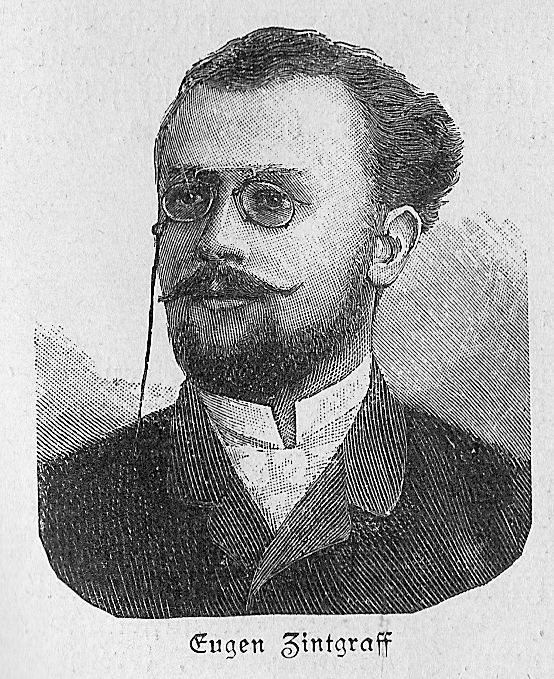
Eugen Zintgraff

Eugen Zintgraff (born 16 January 1858 in Düsseldorf; died 4 December 1897 on Tenerife) was a German explorer.

== Work ==
In 1886, he was sent by the German Foreign Ministry to carry out the first hinterland explorations in Kamerun. He ascended the Wouri River as far as the cataract of Jabassi. He also traced the course of the Old Calabar River into the country of the Banyang and established Batom station. In 1889 Zintgraff embarked on a major expedition to the northeast, becoming the first European to break out of the coastal jungles of Cameroons, climbed into Babessong (Ashong) from where his party traveled to Bali Nyonga. Proceeding even further north, he arrived at the end of May 1888 at Ibi on the Benue River.
