= Woermann-Linie =

German shipping company

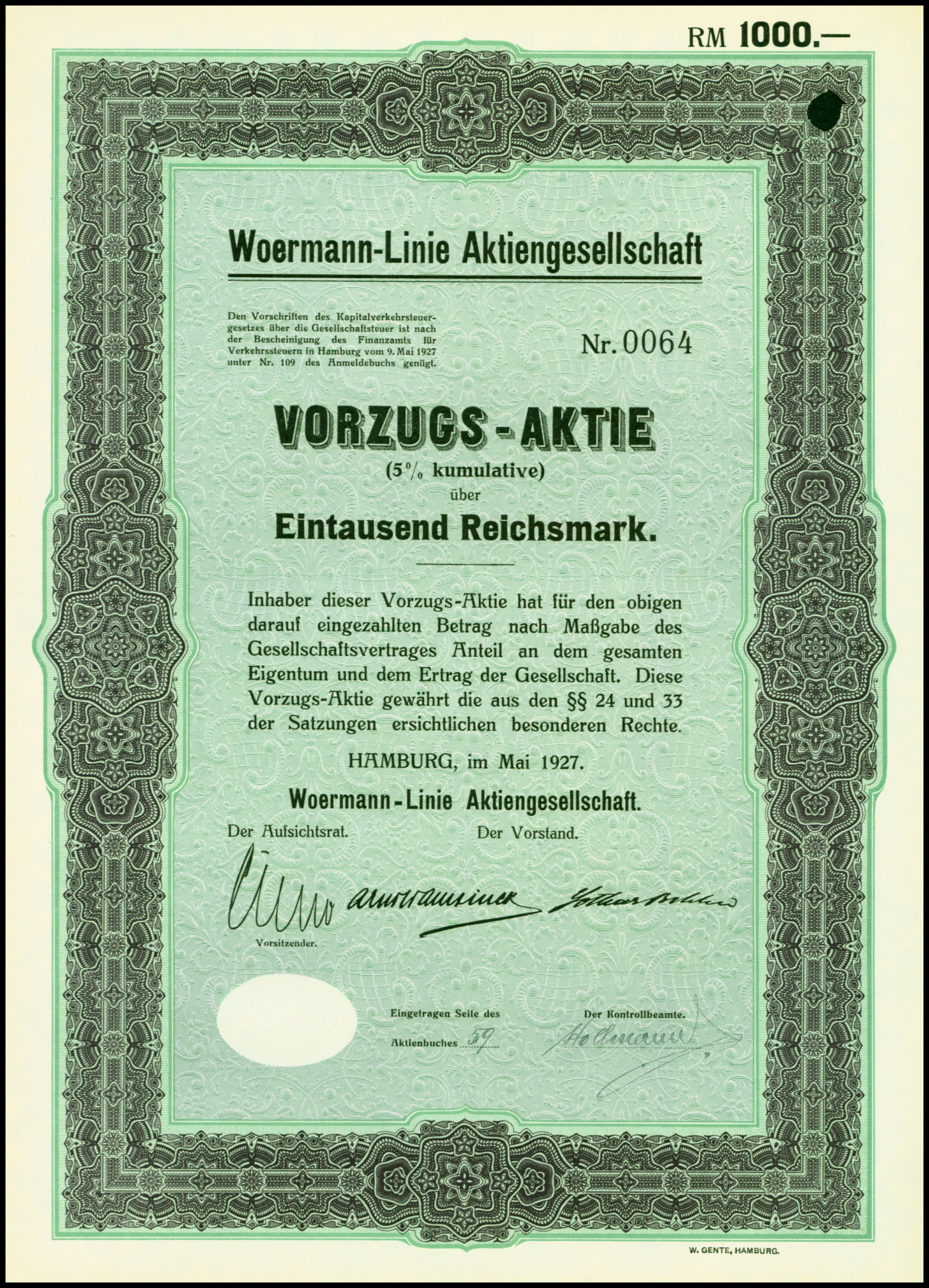
Preferred Share of the Woermann-Linie, issued May 1927

House flag used by Woermann-Linie.

The Woermann-Linie was a German shipping company that operated from 1885 (141 years ago) to 1942 (84 years ago).

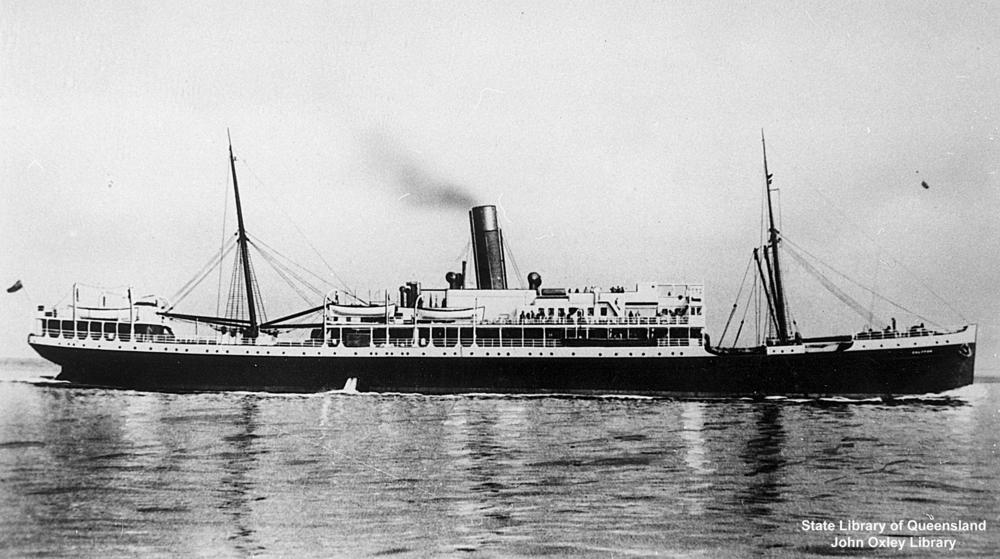
Woermann-Linie's 3,908 GRT passenger ship Alexandra Woermann. The UK Shipping Controller seized her in 1919 as part of World War I reparations and sold her in 1920 to Ellerman's Wilson Lines.

== History ==
It was founded on 15 June 1885 by Adolph Woermann and developed as one of the leading shipping companies between Europe and Africa. From 1899 the company was headquartered in Afrikahaus, in Hamburg.

For decades it transported contract laborers to various places on the African continent, for instance, workers from Liberia and Nigeria to Spanish Guinea.

The Woermann family sold it to Deutsche Ost-Afrika Linie in 1916.

In 1942, it and the Deutsche Ost-Afrika Linie were taken over by John T. Essberger. The Deutsche Afrika-Linien lost both fleets in post-war reparations.

== See also ==
- Defunct shipping companies
