= Adolph Woermann =

German merchant (1847–1911)

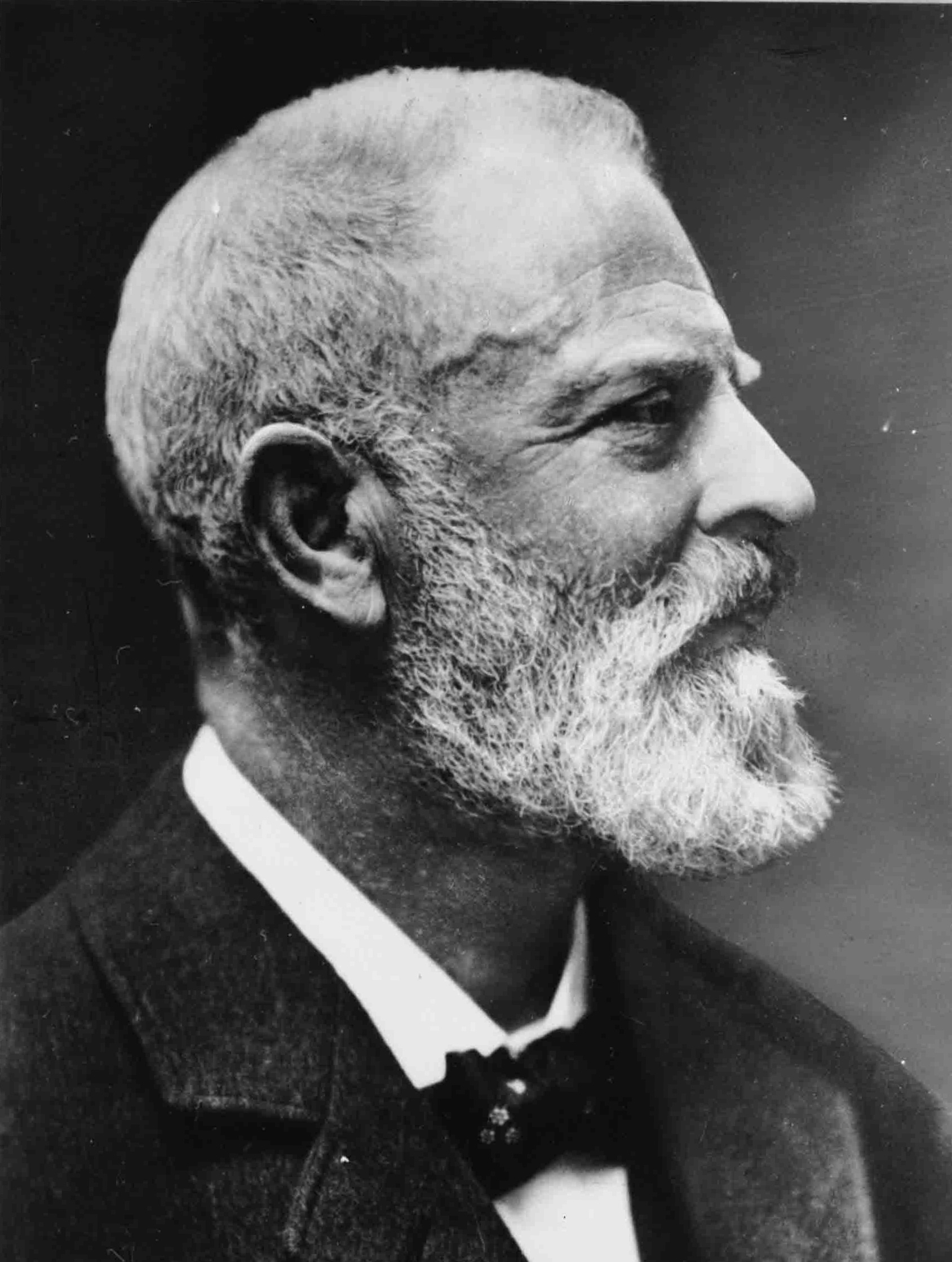
Adolph Woermann

Adolph Woermann (10 December 1847 in Hamburg – 4 May 1911 in the Grönwohld-Hof near Trittau) was a German merchant, shipowner and politician, who was also instrumental in the establishment of German colonies in Africa. In his time he was the largest German trader to West Africa and – with his Woermann-Linie – the largest private shipowner in the world. He remains a controversial figure, for the fact that he accumulated his vast fortunes from exploitation and war profiteering, particularly during the Herero Wars.

When the Herero uprising broke out in German South West Africa, Woermann's company was the only one which offered an open connection to the colony. Soldiers, horses, weapons, equipment, and supplies were transported to the colony almost exclusively through his company. By 1906, the Woermann Line had transported over 14,000 men and over 11,000 horses to the war zone. The company also used warehouses to store beds, provisions, and equipment for departing troops. The war brought Woerman unexpected profits, which nearly doubled during the Herero and Nama genocide. Woermann transported several hundred Hereros to Swakopmund for forced labour. During the war, the Woermann Line received 115 prisoners to be used for forced labour. Nearly a tenth of the company's workers did so without pay. The company ran its own labour camps.
