= Nyang Nyang Festival =

Biennial cultural festival in Bafoussam, Cameroon

Nyang Nyang Festival Nyan-Nyang
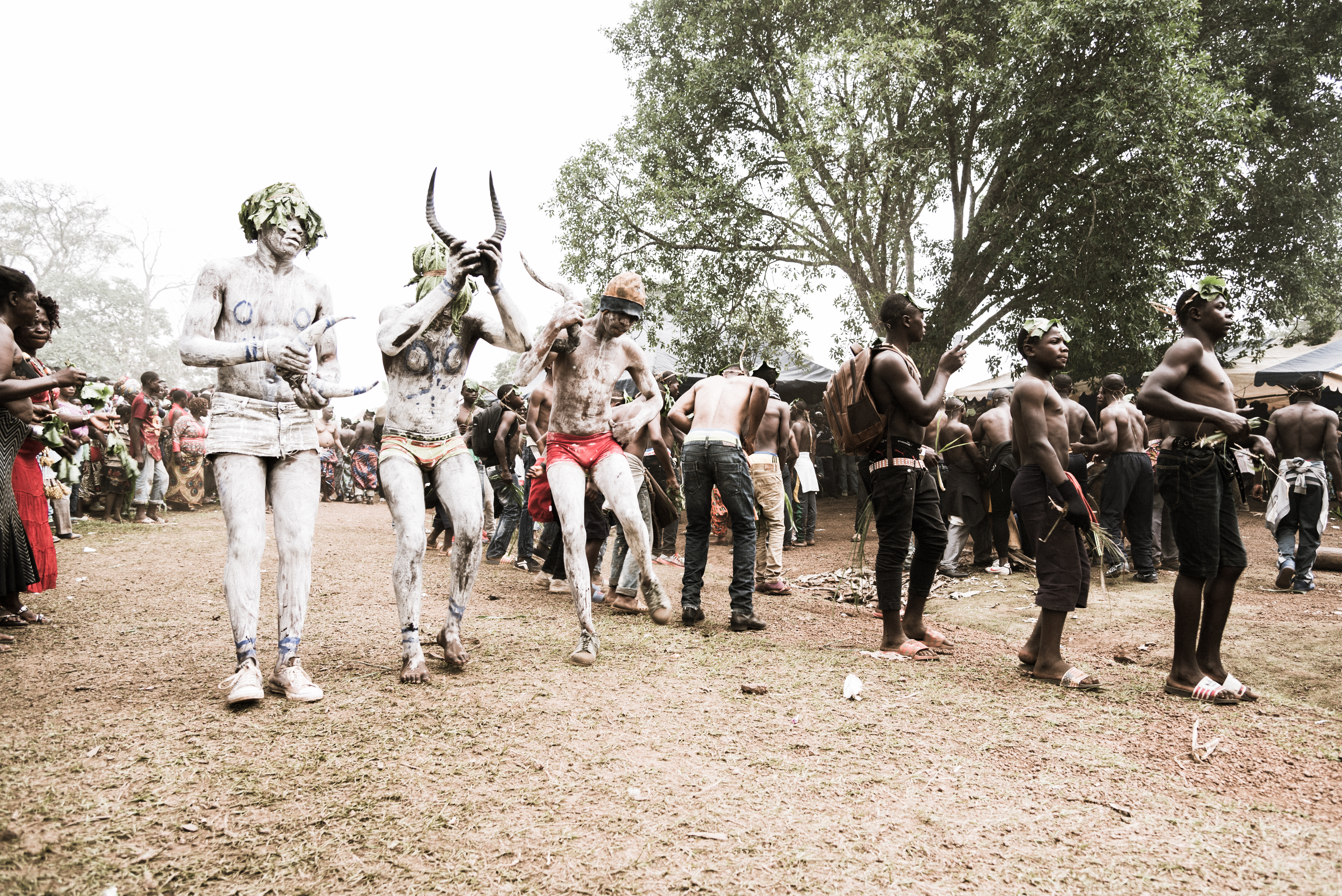
- Genre: Cultural, Initiation, Carnival
- Frequency: Biennial (Every 2 years); Duration: Approx. 4 months
- Locations: Bafoussam Royal Palace, Cameroon
- Organised by: Fussep traditional authorities

The Nyang Nyang Festival (also spelled Nyan-Nyang) is a biennial traditional festival celebrated by the Fussep (Bafoussam) and Baleng peoples of the Bamileke ethnic group in the West Region of Cameroon. Held in the city of Bafoussam known as Fussep in the local language every two years, it is widely regarded as one of the oldest traditional carnivals in Africa and is considered the longest festival in Cameroon, lasting approximately four months.

The festival name derives from the cry of ravens or crows (nyang nyang) that echo in the fields during the harvest season, symbolically accompanying women as they work the land. In the local tongue, Nyang Nyang translates broadly as "power" or "magic", reflecting the festival's deep spiritual and communal significance.

== Background ==
=== People and Place ===
This festival, is owned and practiced by the people of Bafoussam, Bafoussam is the capital of the West Region of Cameroon and the heartland of the Bamileke people, a group renowned for their rich cultural heritage, masquerade traditions, and elaborate ceremonial life. The indigenous inhabitants of Bafoussam refer to themselves as the Fussep, a name derived from their ancestral Tikar heritage. The Bamileke trace their origins to the Tikar people of the Adamawa Plateau, who migrated southward into the forested highlands following historical conflicts and invasions.

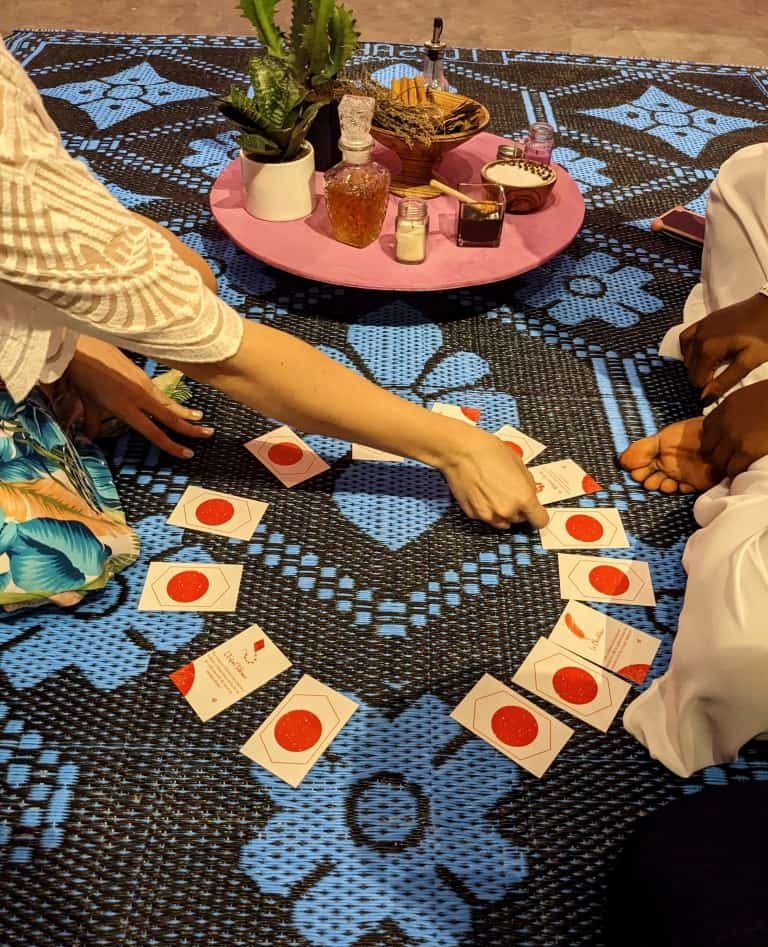
Speaking with the spirits at the Nyang Nyang Festival

=== Historical Significance ===
The Nyang Nyang Festival is believed to have a history spanning over 800 years, with editions numbering beyond 460 as of the mid-2020s. It is considered one of Africa's oldest living carnivals and represents an unbroken chain of cultural continuity among the Fussep people.

The festival holds a status among the Fussep comparable to that of the Ngondo Festival among the Sawa peoples of Cameroon's Littoral Region both being supreme expressions of cultural identity and communal solidarity. Unlike the Ngondo, which lasts only a few days, the Nyang Nyang extends over several months.

== Name and Meaning ==
The term Nyang Nyang is derived from the call of the raven, a bird whose cries traditionally accompanied the harvest season in Bamileke farming communities. Women working in the fields during the harvest period would hear the ravens' calls overhead, and the festival's name memorialises this intimate connection between community life, the land, and the natural world.

The name Nyang Nyang carries a dual meaning literally referencing the sound of the raven's cry, and more broadly conveying the idea of power and magic, reflecting the festival's role as both a spiritual rite and a public celebration of collective strength among the Fussep and Baleng peoples.

== Frequency and Duration ==
The Nyang Nyang Festival takes place once every two years, typically beginning in November and concluding in February of the following year.This four-month span makes it one of the longest recurring traditional festivals in the world.

The biennial timing is deliberately aligned with the harvest period, linking the festival's ceremonies to cycles of agricultural abundance, fertility, and renewal.

== Ceremonies and Programme ==
The festival follows a carefully structured calendar, with designated entry days (Shienku) and exit days (Gossa Touopsa'a) marking the ritual progression of events.

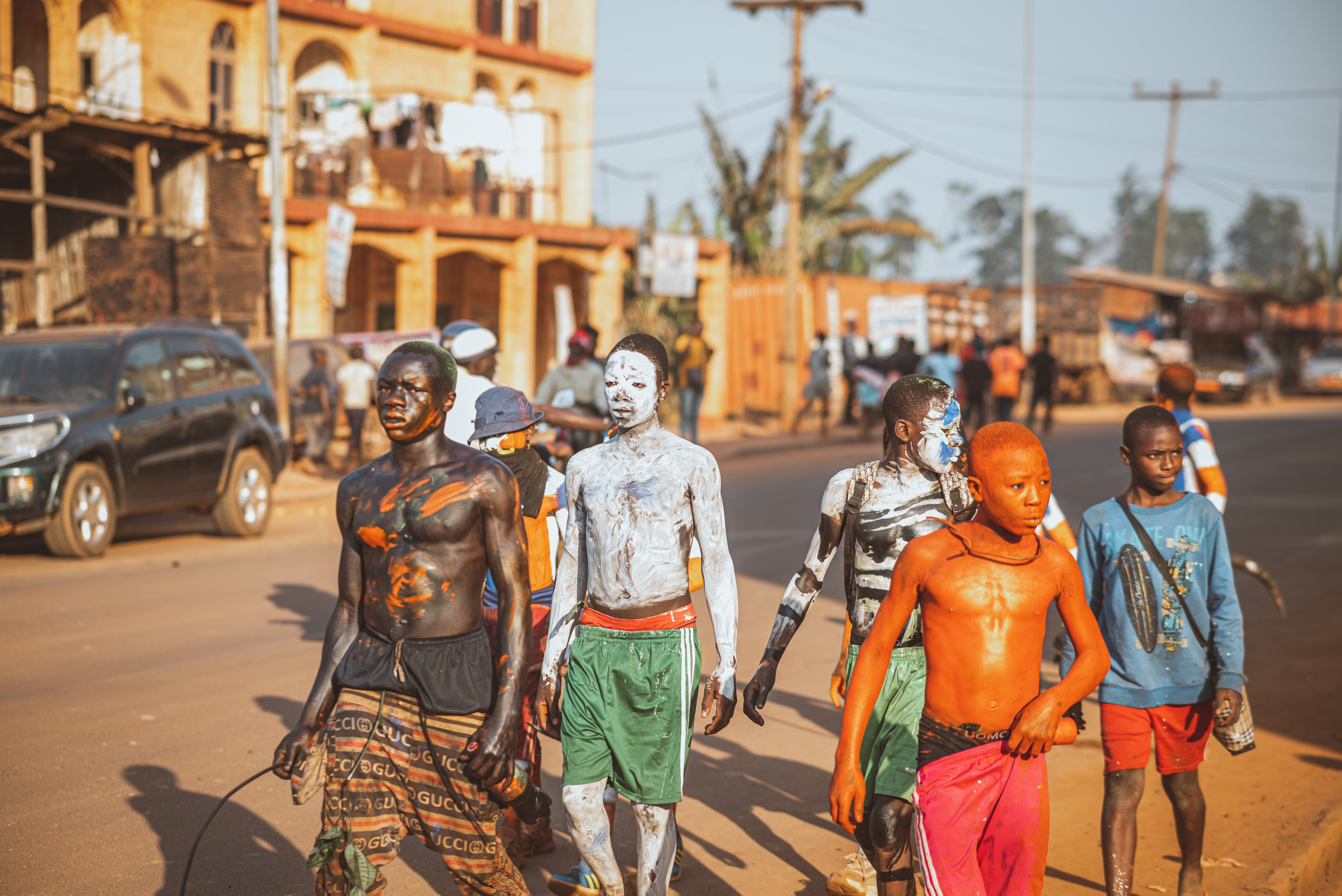
Colourful group of young boys attending the Nyang Nyang heritage festival initiation walk in Bafoussam.

=== Initiation of Youth ===
At the core of the Nyang Nyang Festival is the initiation of young males into the customs, values, and traditions of the Fussep people. Initiates are typically aged between 7 and 15 years, though participants can range in age up to 45 years for community members who may have missed previous editions. Once initiated, these young people are considered full warriors of the community.

During the early weeks of the festival, initiates dance once a week while covering their bodies in mud, coloured substances, and bodily pigments, as well as wearing traditional loincloths and ceremonial masks. The initiations instil values of respect, integrity, and courage, and teach participants key rituals, dances, and ancestral customs of the Fussep.

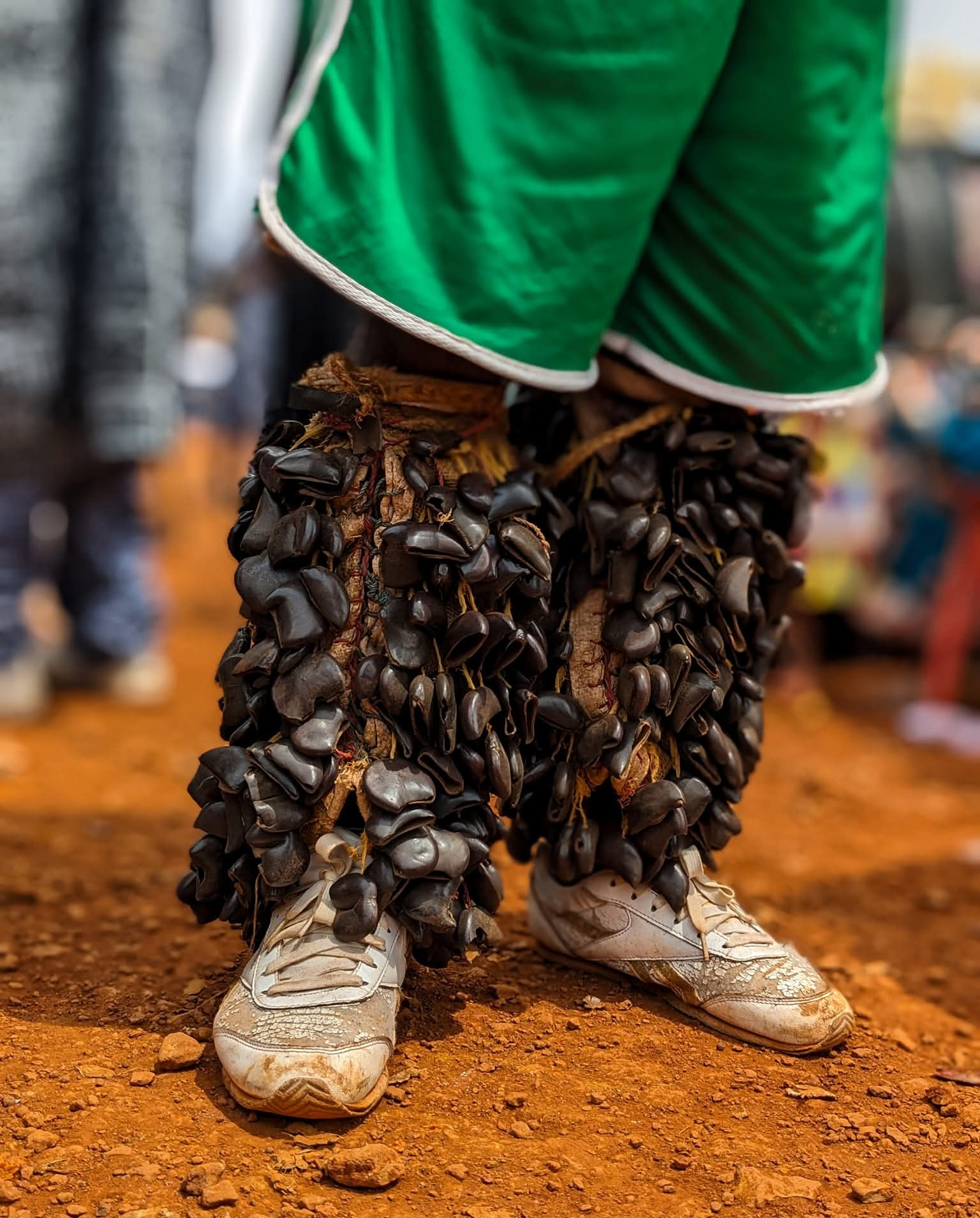
An initiated dancer wears rattles around his calves to dance with.

In the 458th edition (2022–2023), nearly 8,000 young people were initiated, drawn from across Cameroon and the diaspora.

=== Weekly Sacred Dances ===
The festival encompasses thirteen weeks of festivities, with each week featuring a distinct sacred dance performed by the Bafoussam people. These performances progress in spiritual intensity as the festival approaches its climax.

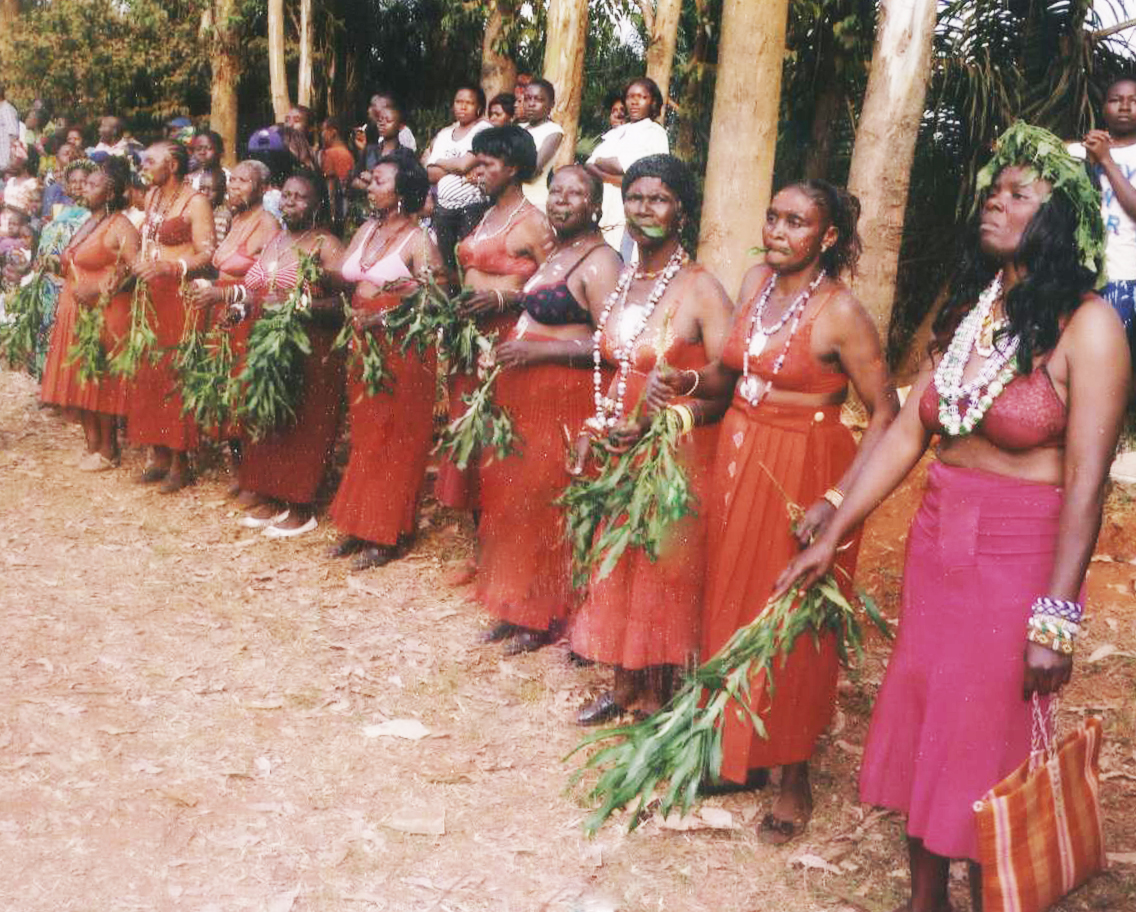
Women at the Nyang Nyang Festival

=== The Royal Court, Queen Mothers and Meku ===
A significant feature of the festival is the prominent role of the Queen Mothers (Mafo) the senior women of the royal court. Special recognition is given to the Meku women who have given birth to twins or triplets, which in Fussep tradition is considered a powerful and sacred event. The Queen Mothers and Meku participate in public ceremonies, representing the spiritual and social continuity of the Fussep lineage.

=== Contemporary Activities and Miss Nyang Nyang ===
A Miss Nyang Nyang pageant is held as part of the activities, celebrating young Fussep women and their connection to cultural heritage. Beyond purely ritual dimensions, modern editions include traditional carnivals, a marathon race, artisanal exhibitions, and musical concerts to welcome visitors and the diaspora.

== Climactic Ceremony ==
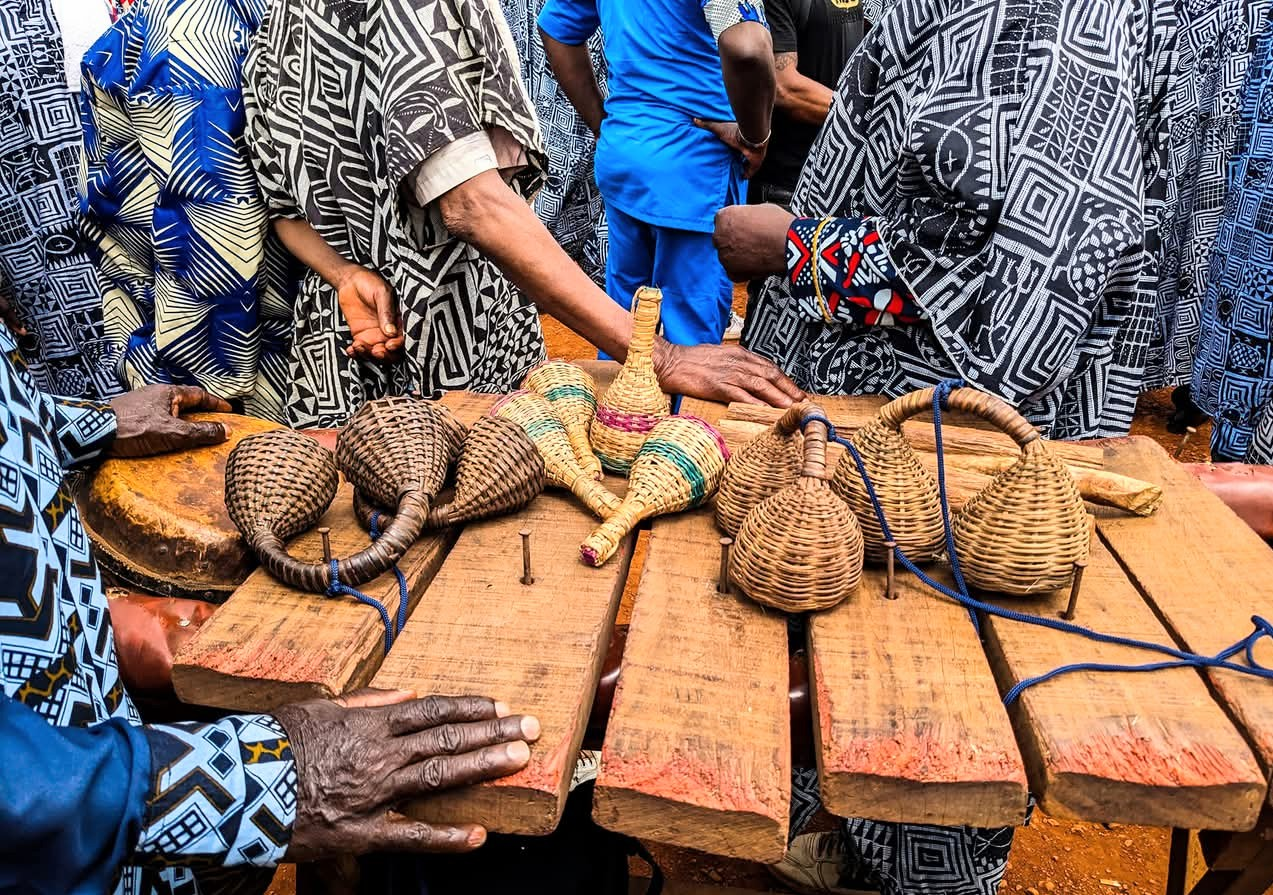
Traditional musical instruments at the Nyang Nyang Festival

The pinnacle of the Nyang Nyang Festival is the Koumdze (also called Kabem) dance, performed on the final day of the festival, representing the most sacred event of the celebration.

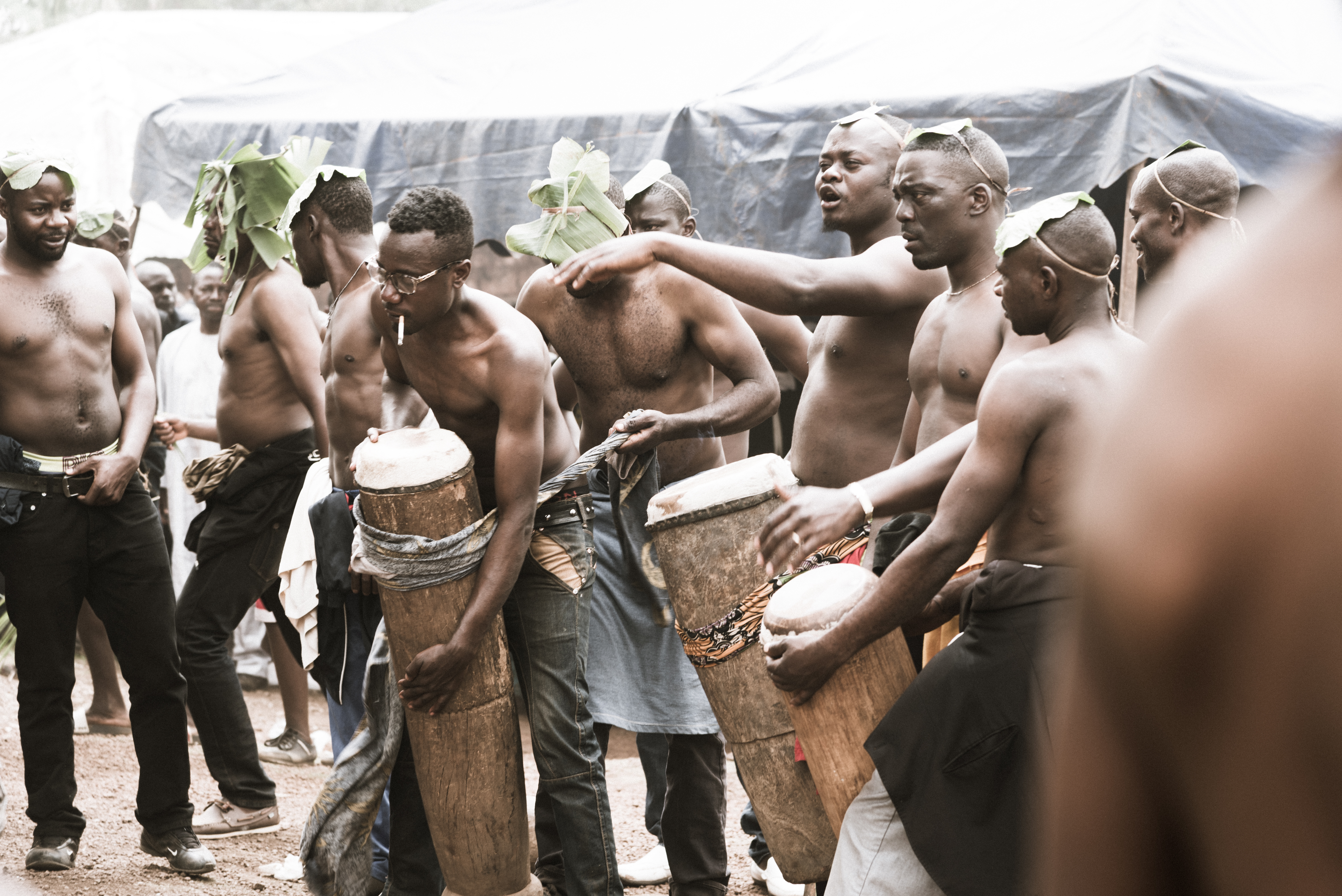
Boys playing the tam-tams

The ceremony unfolds with a procession of the Queens, ancestral speeches, the honoring of the Meku, and the crowning of Miss Nyang Nyang. Following a ritual animal sacrifice for purification, initiated youth emerge from the sacred forest to the beat of tam-tams. Senior notables and the reigning king then enter the courtyard to dance completely barefoot, a practice symbolizing an enduring physical connection to their ancestral soil (terre nourricière).
