= Ngondo =

Annual festival in Douala, Cameroon

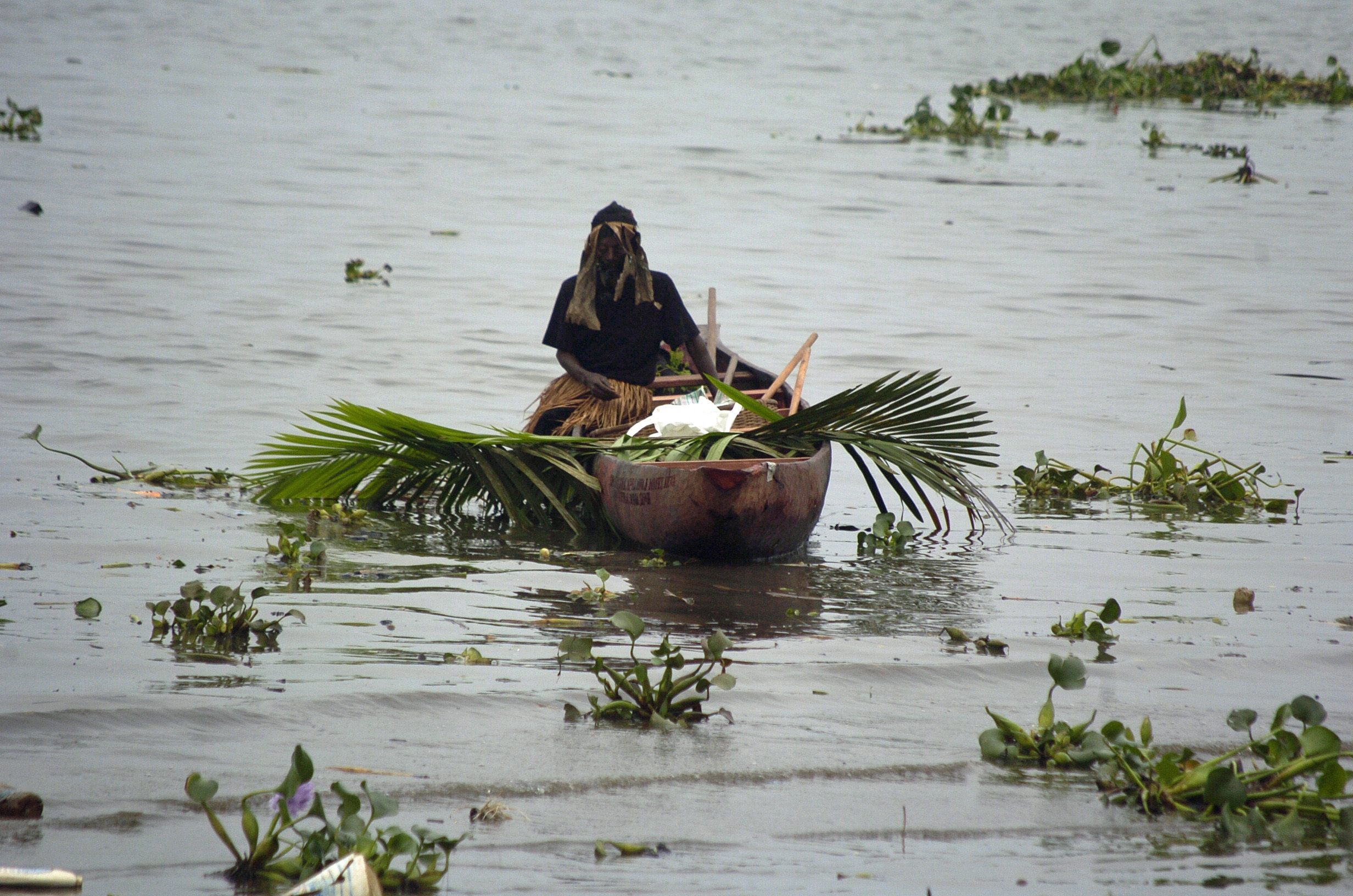
Ngondo messenger on Wouri River

The Ngondo is an annual water-centered festival held by the Sawa (coastal peoples) in Douala, Cameroon. The highlight of the festival is a ceremony of the jengu. The ceremony is held at a beach on Wouri Bay, during which a devotee enters the water to visit the underwater kingdom of the miengu (plural for jengu). The miengu are believed to be similar to mermaids, and will grant good luck to their worshippers. According to tradition, the devotee can remain underwater for hours, and emerge with his clothing appearing completely dry. Children are not allowed to attend the ceremony. Ngondo was banned by the government of Cameroon in 1981, but reinstated in 1991. The ceremony is held during the first two weeks of December every year.

== Gallery ==
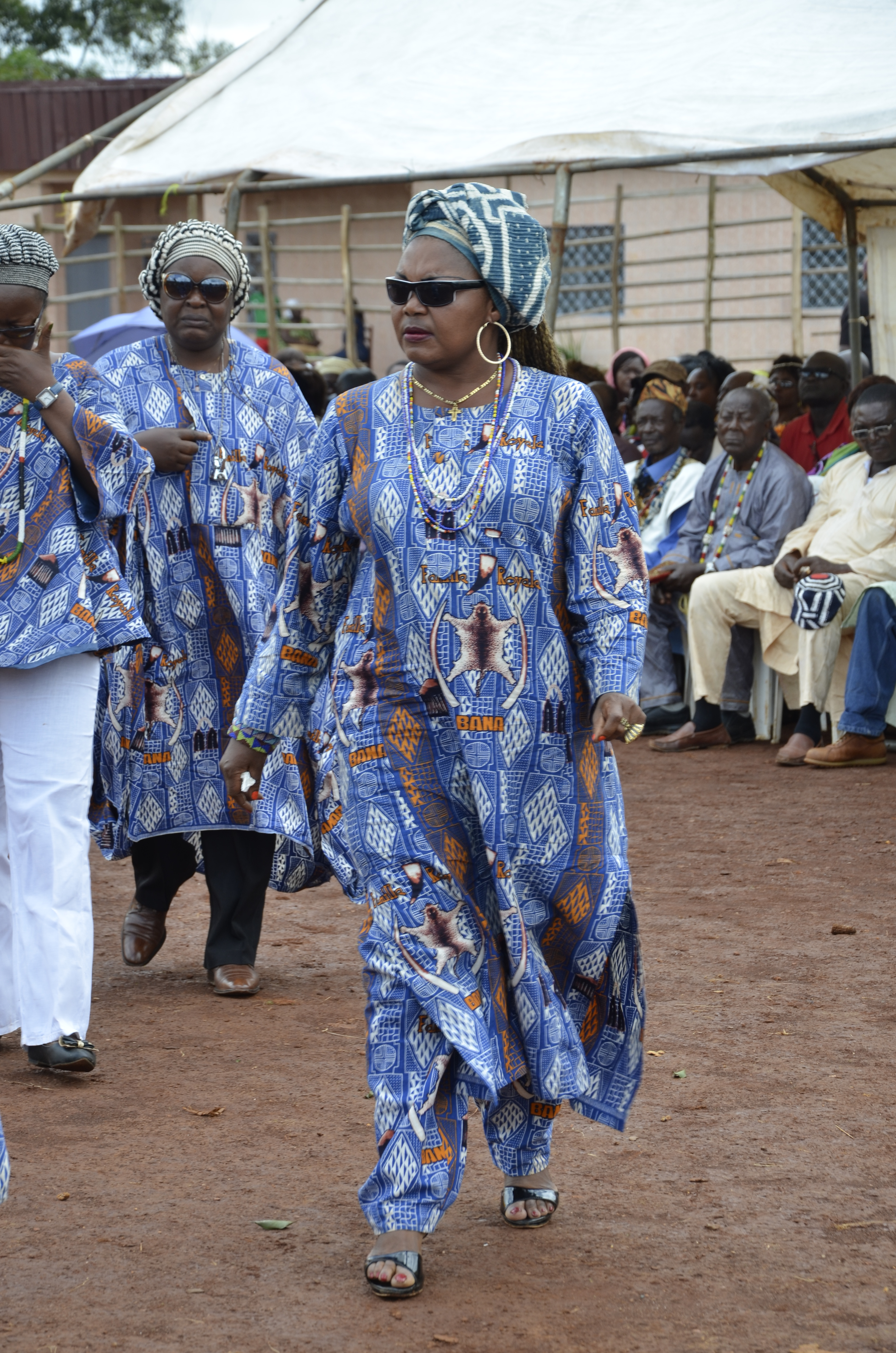
Women with blue Kaba

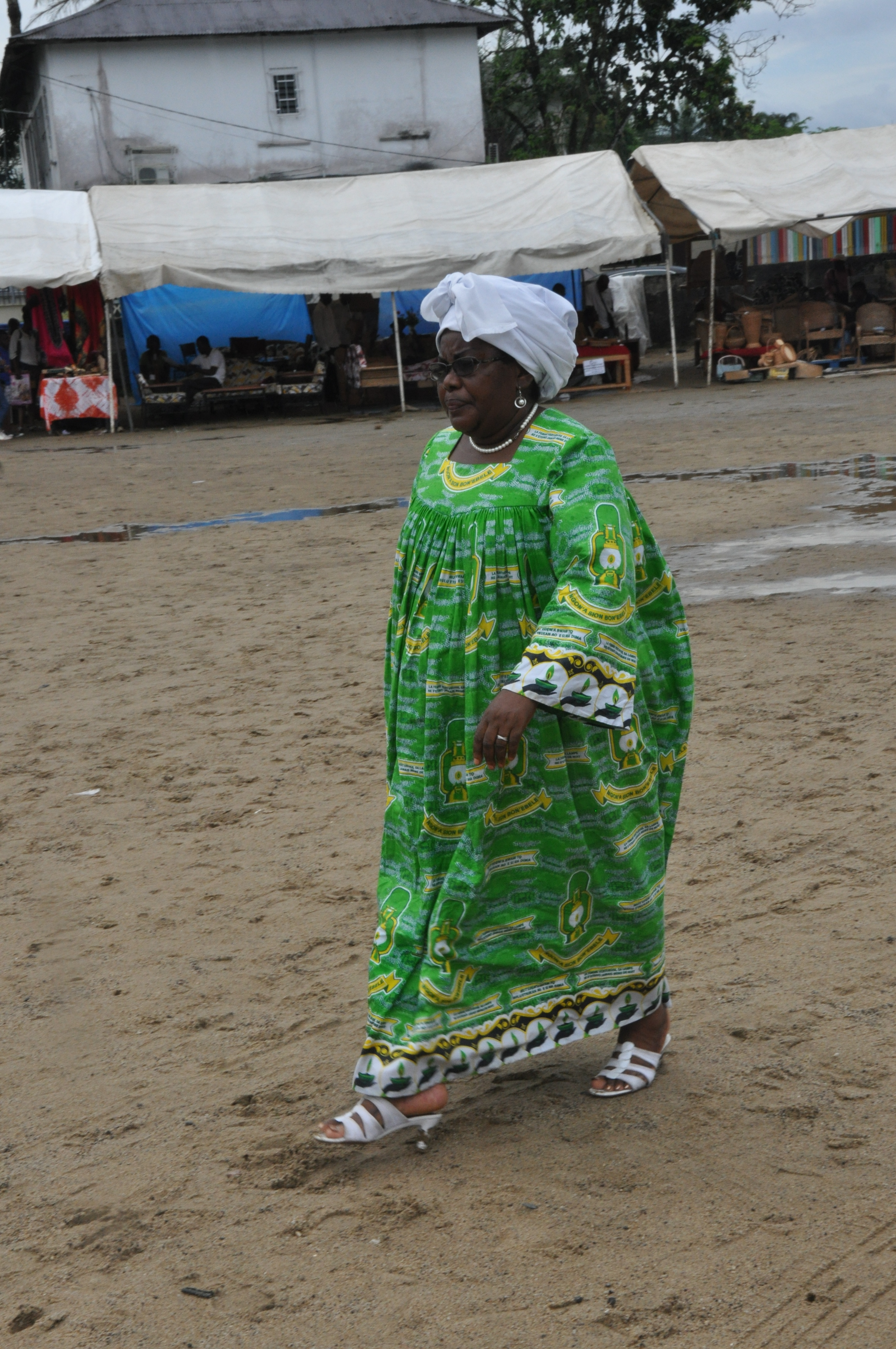
Woman with green Kaba

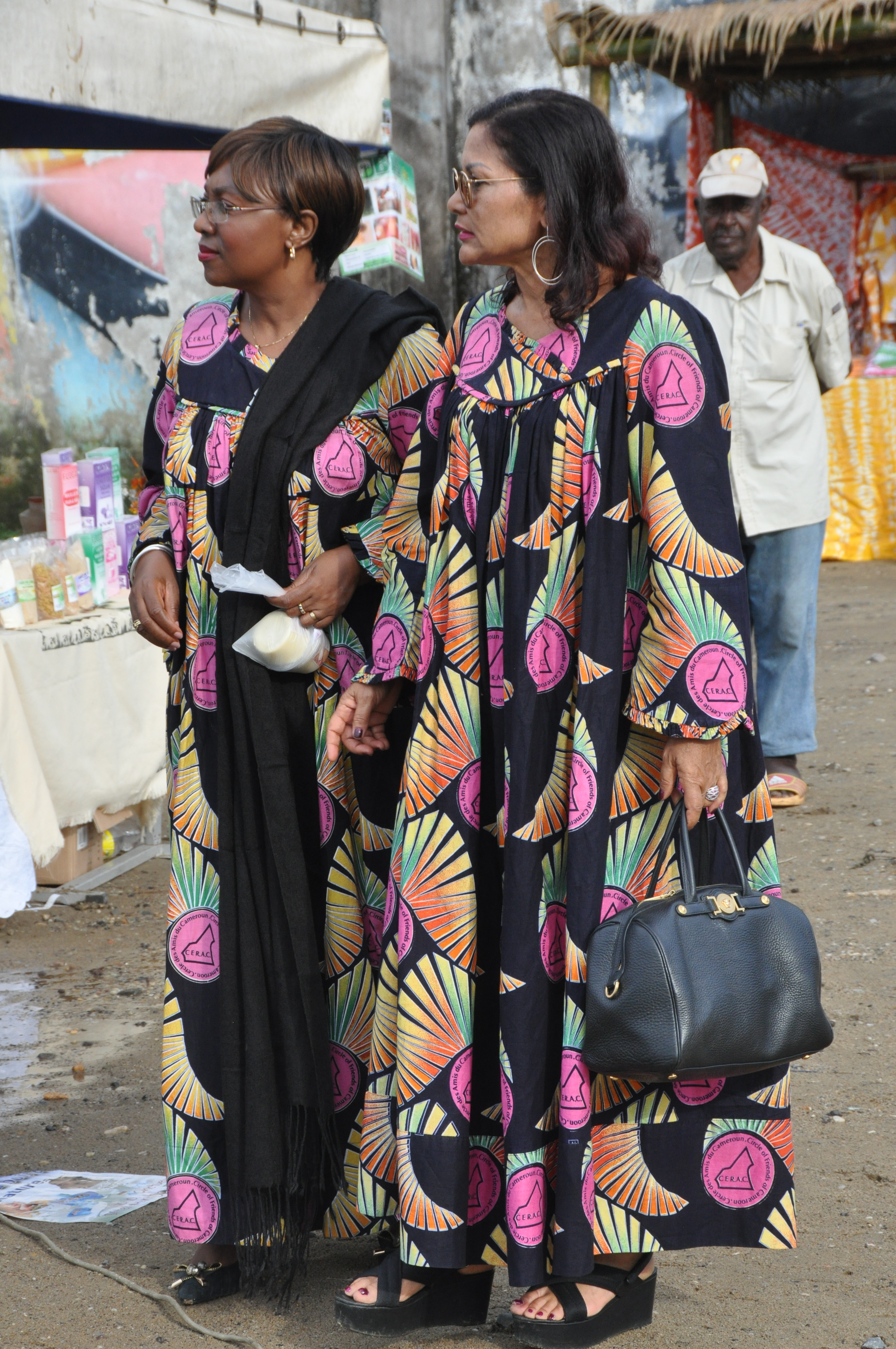
Women with black Kaba

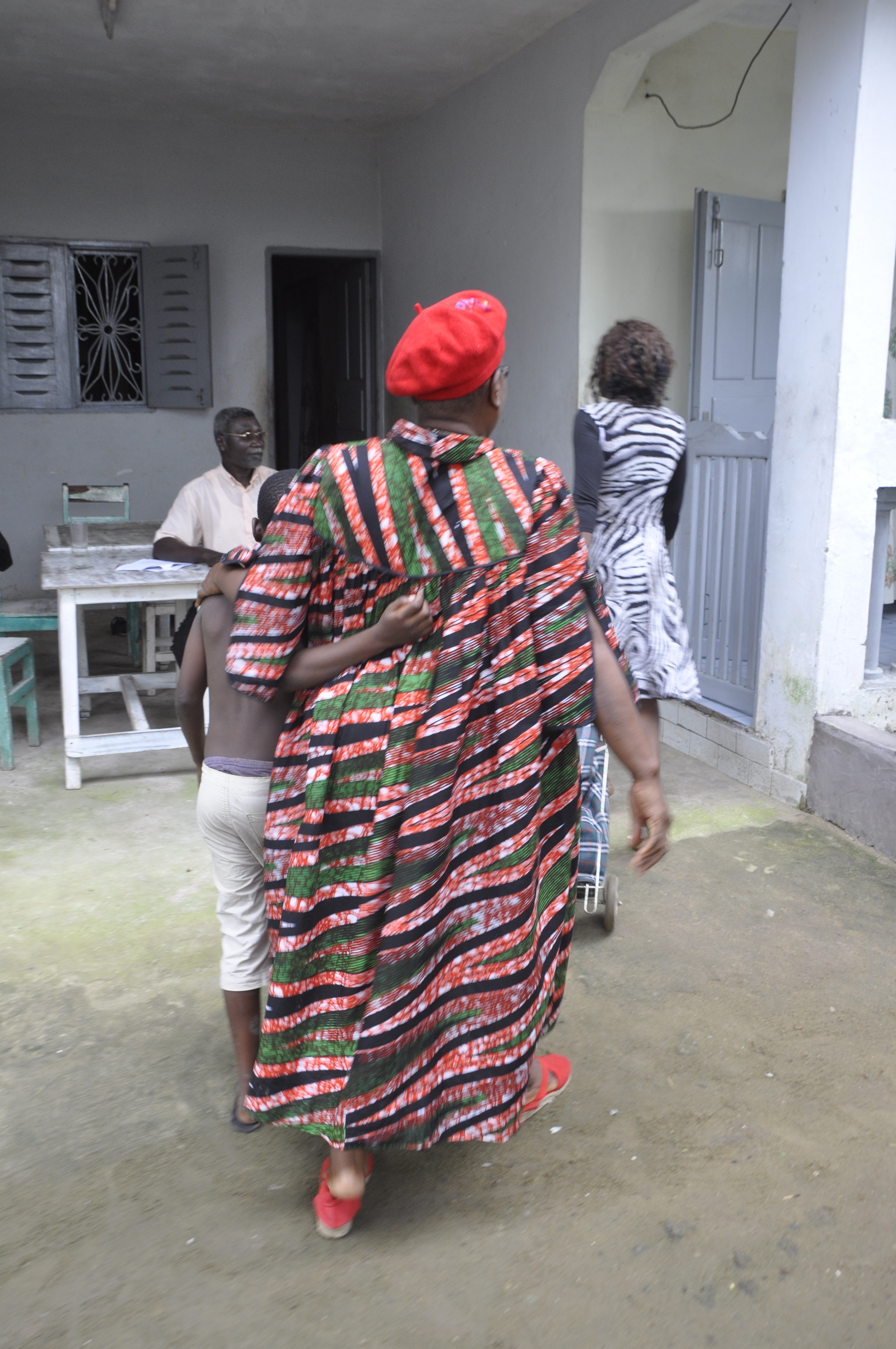
Women with striped Kaba

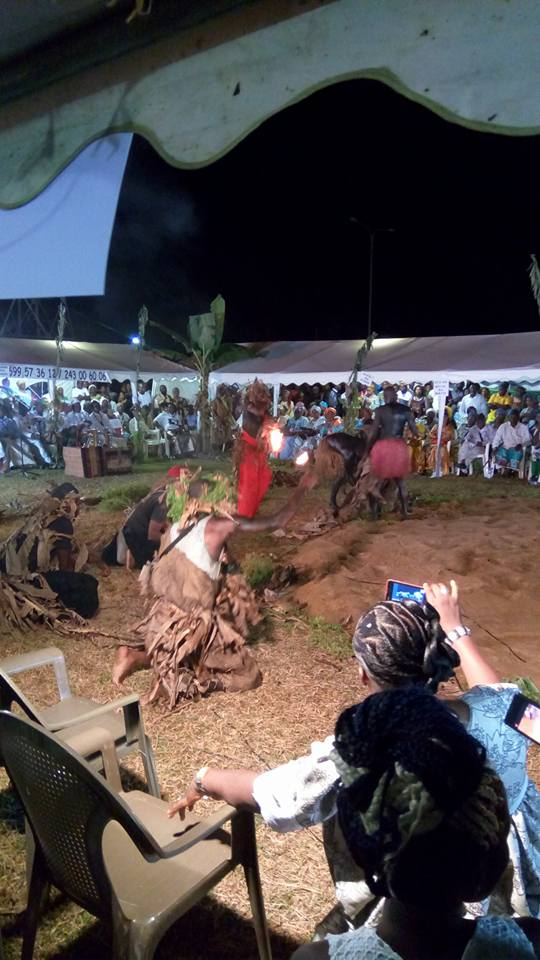
Festival evening

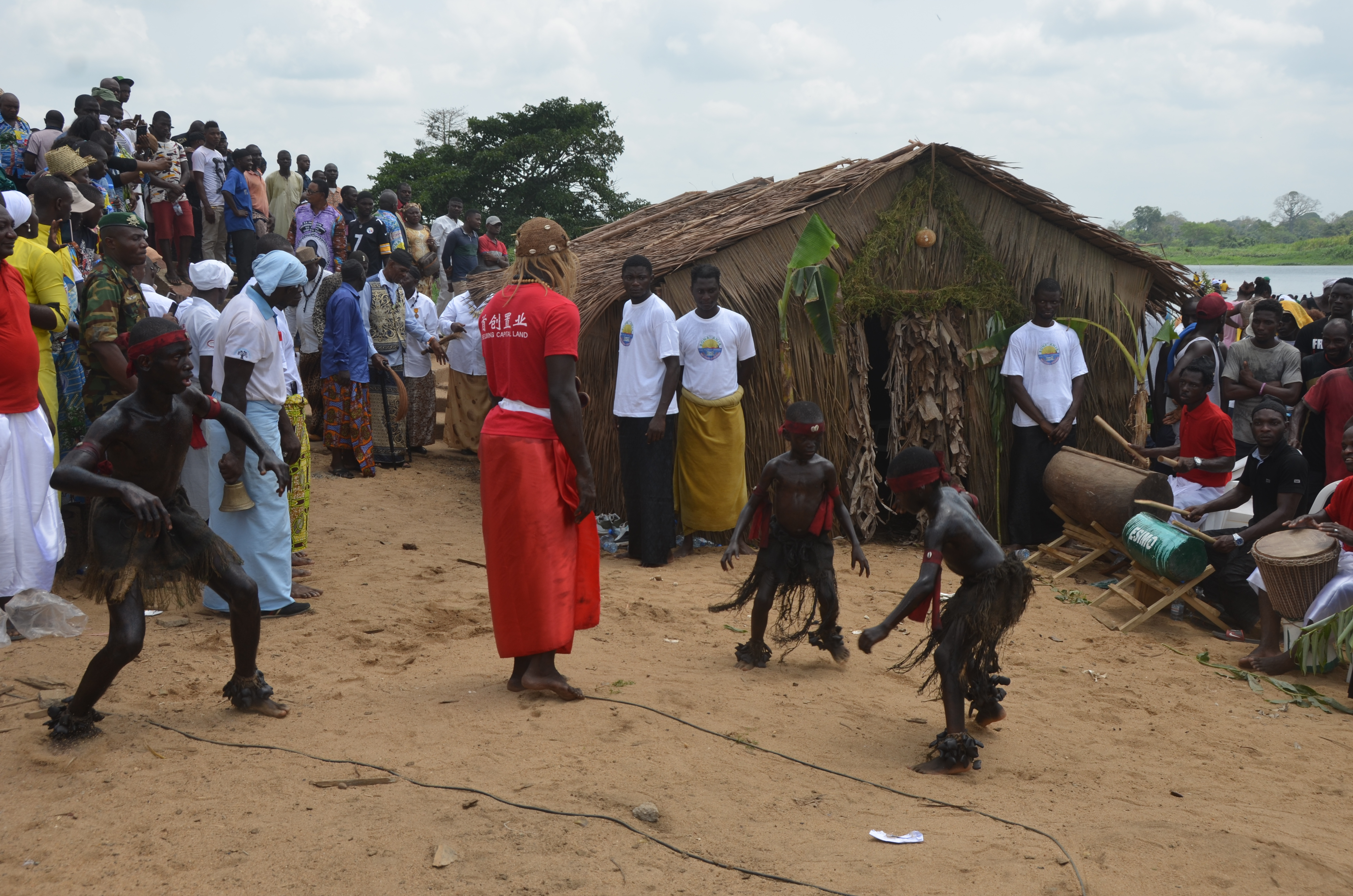
Ritual

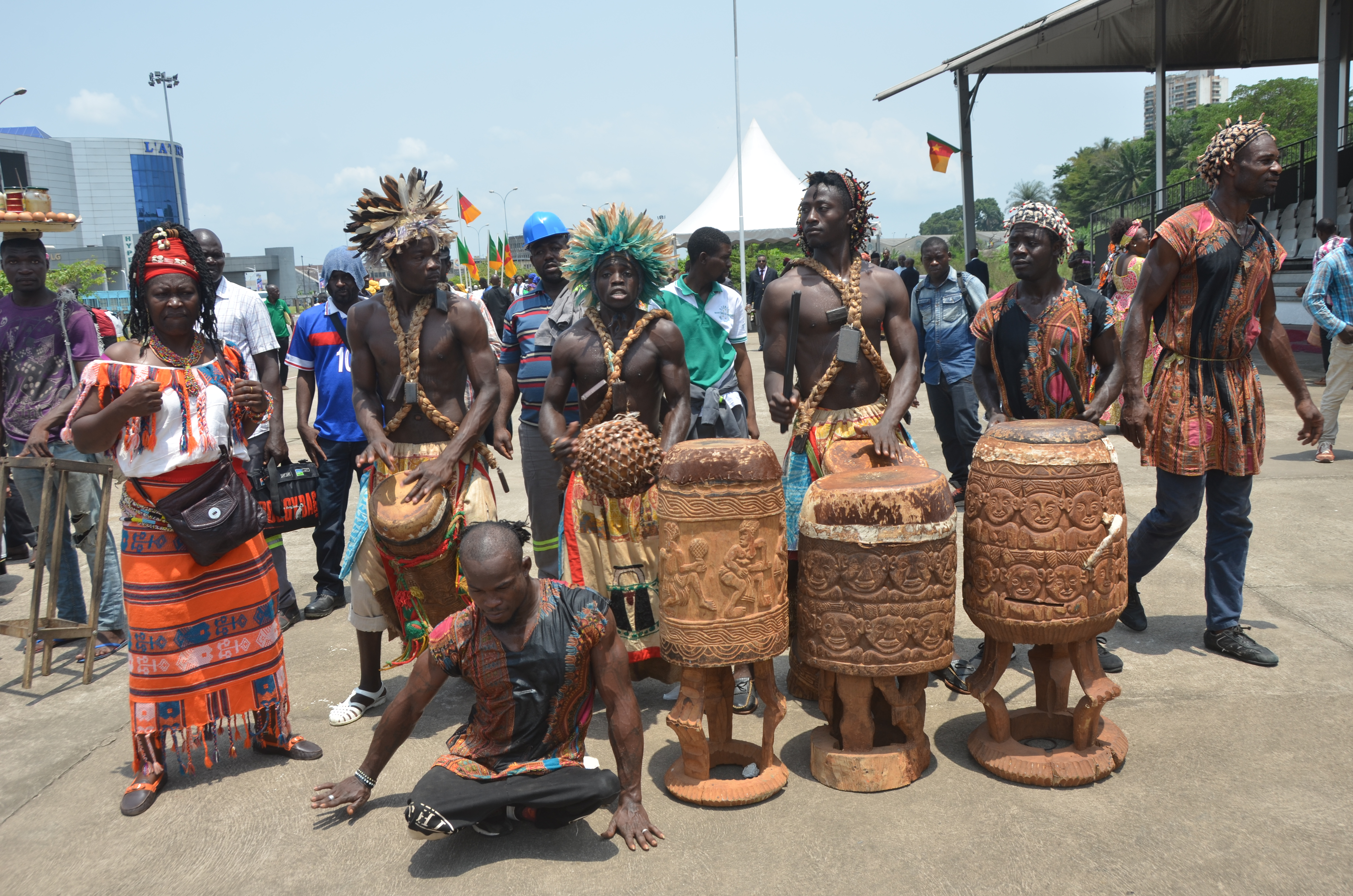
West community invited at Ngondo

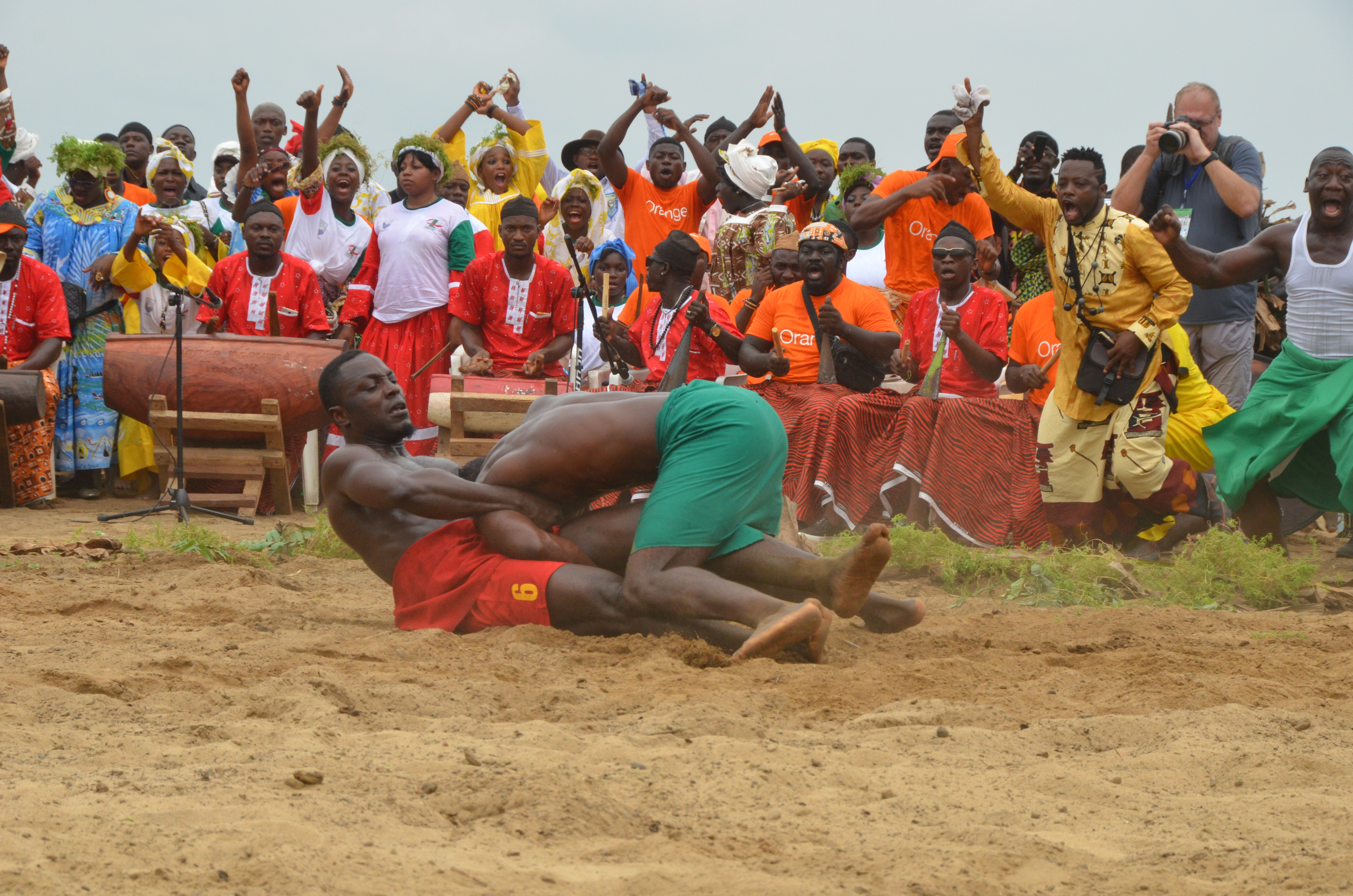
Ngondo Traditional wrestling

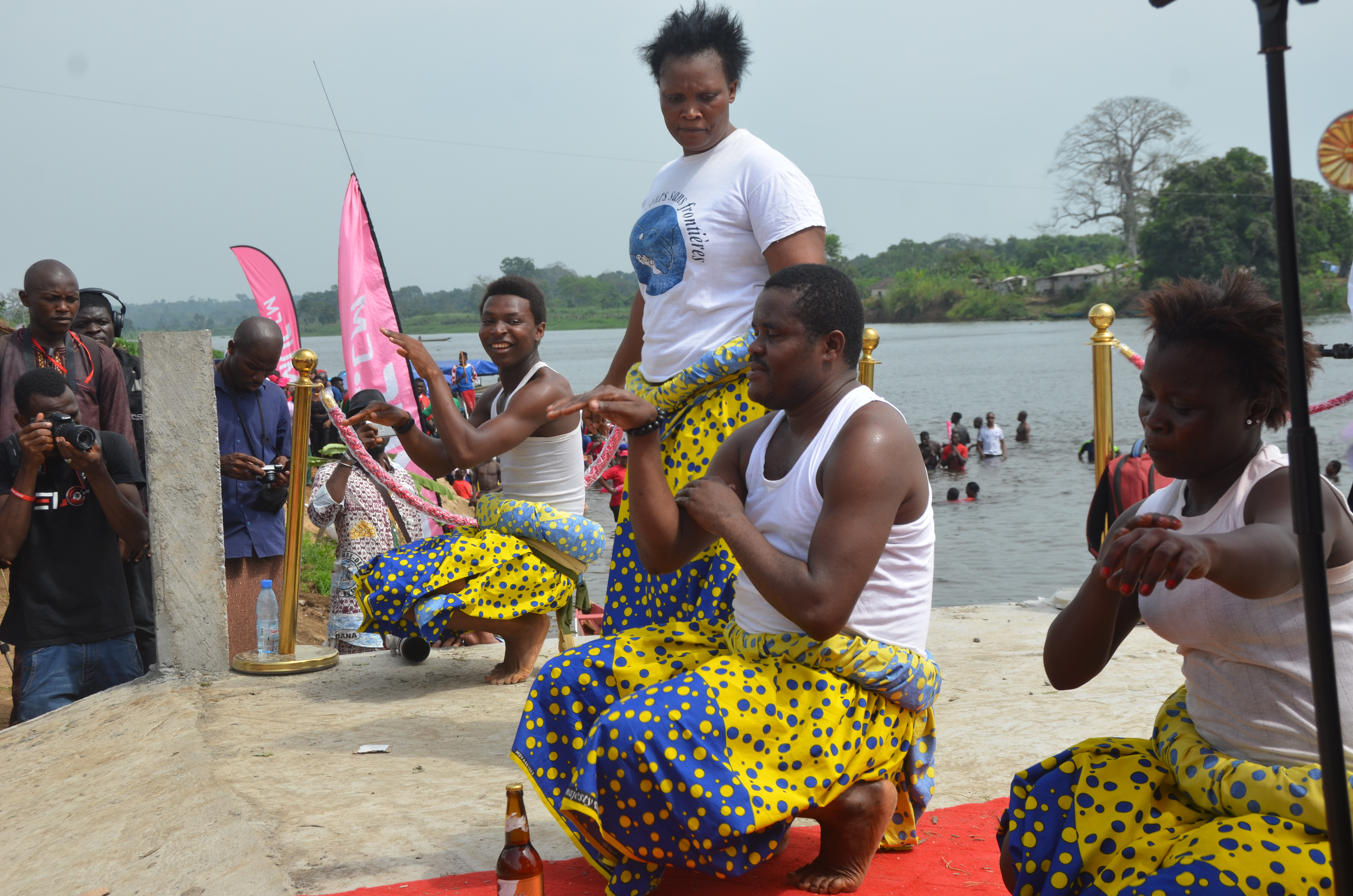
Assiko Dancers

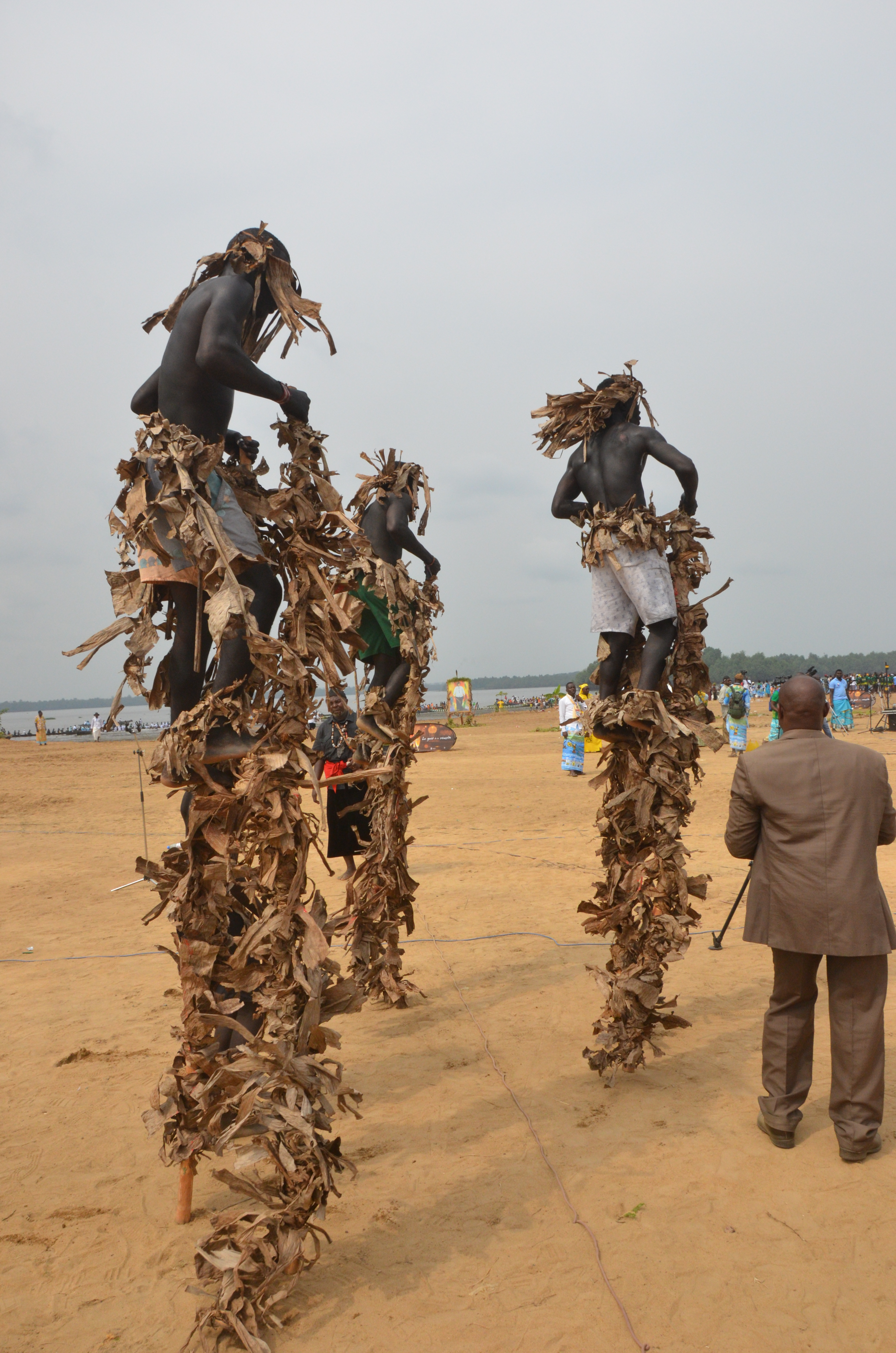

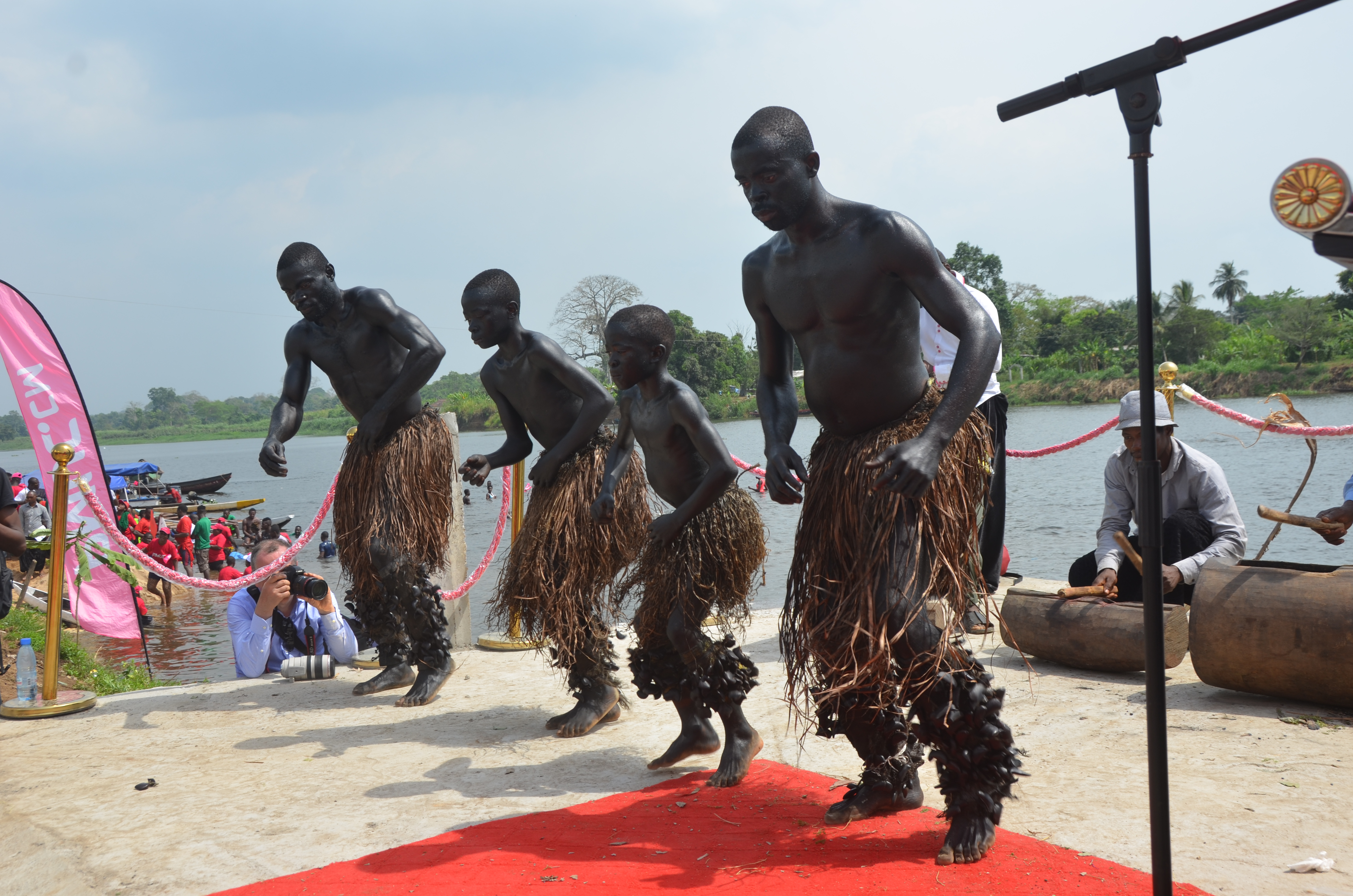

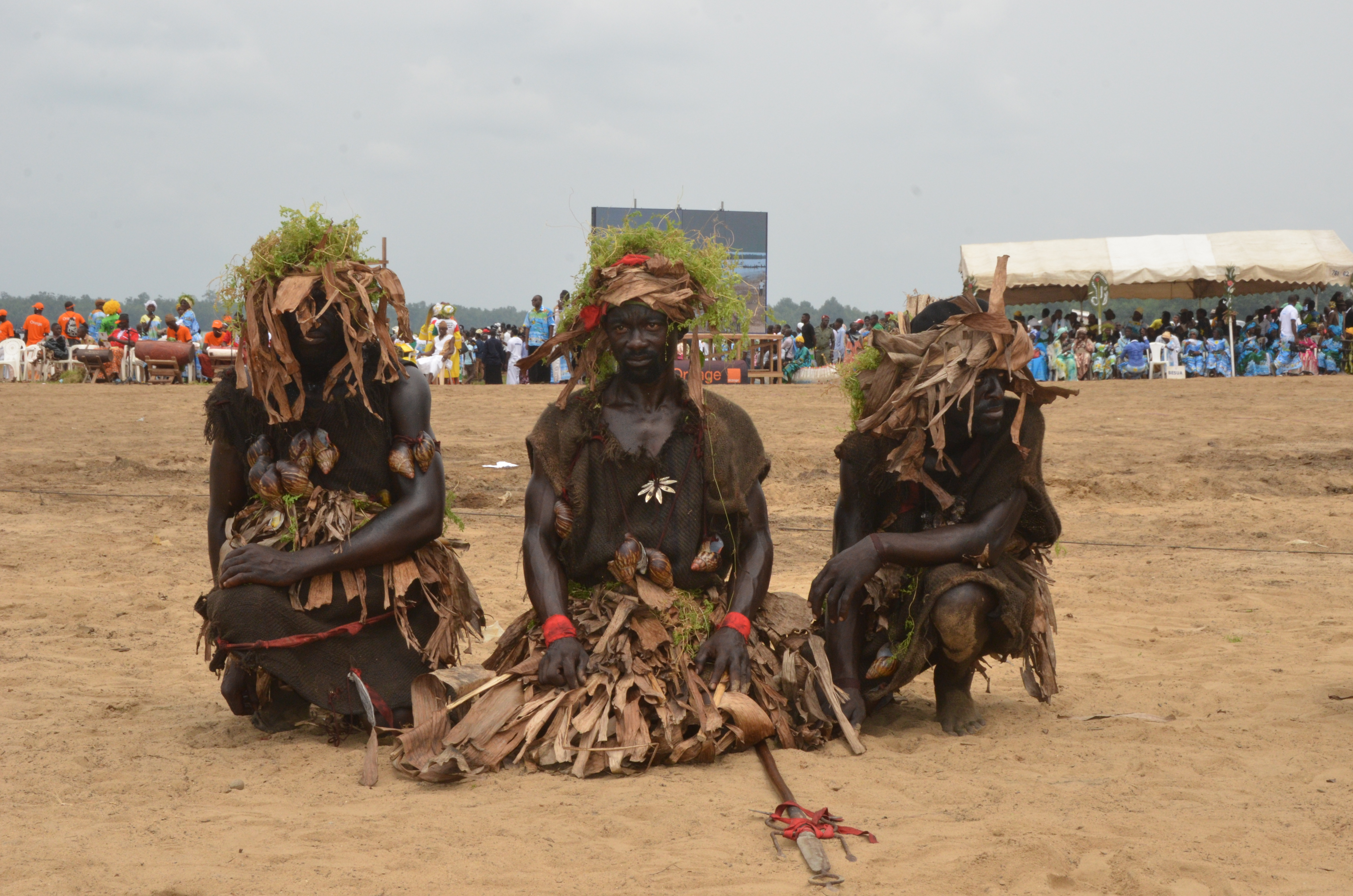

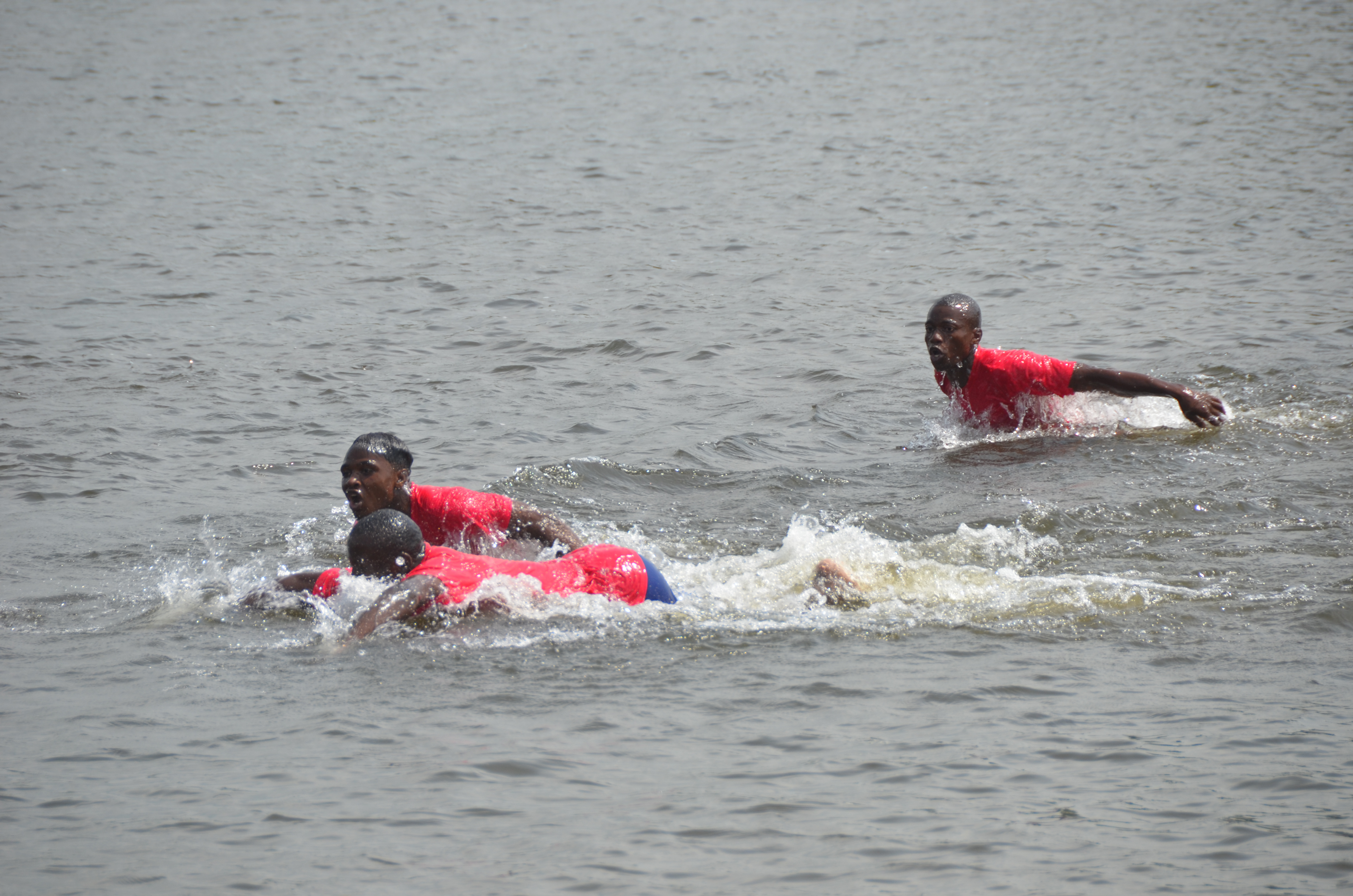
swimming competition

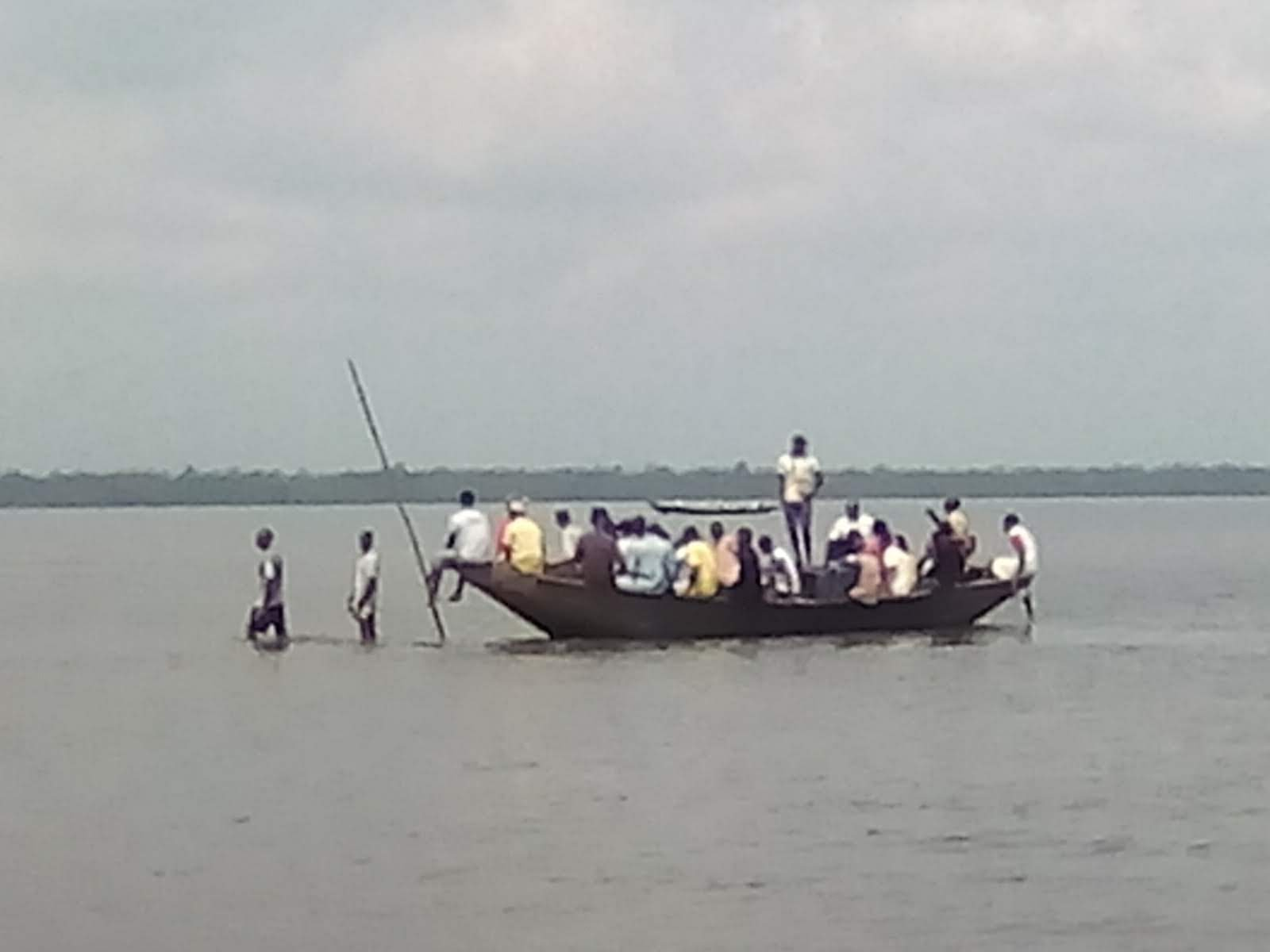
Ritual pirogue

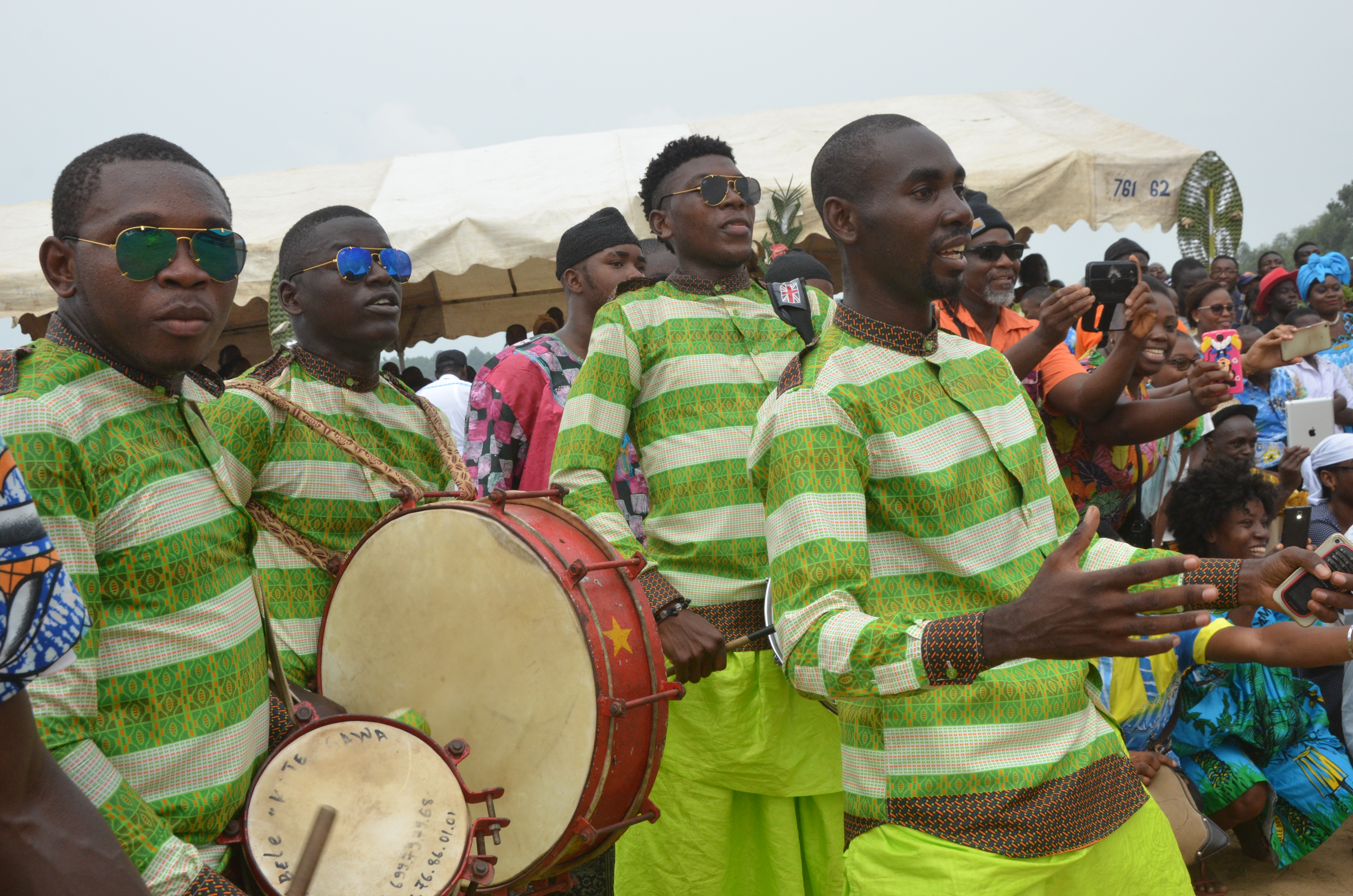
Abele singers

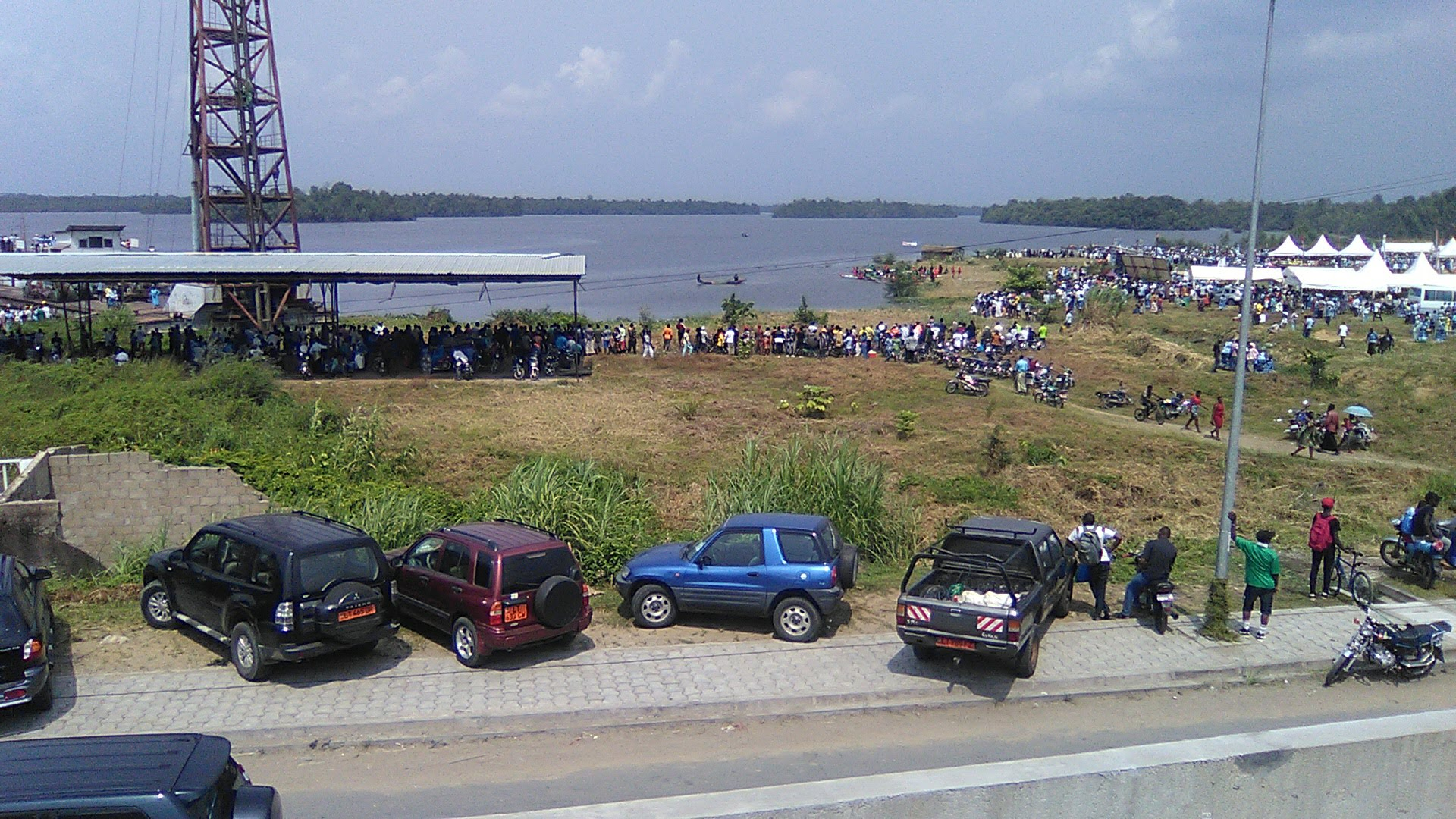
Ngondo place

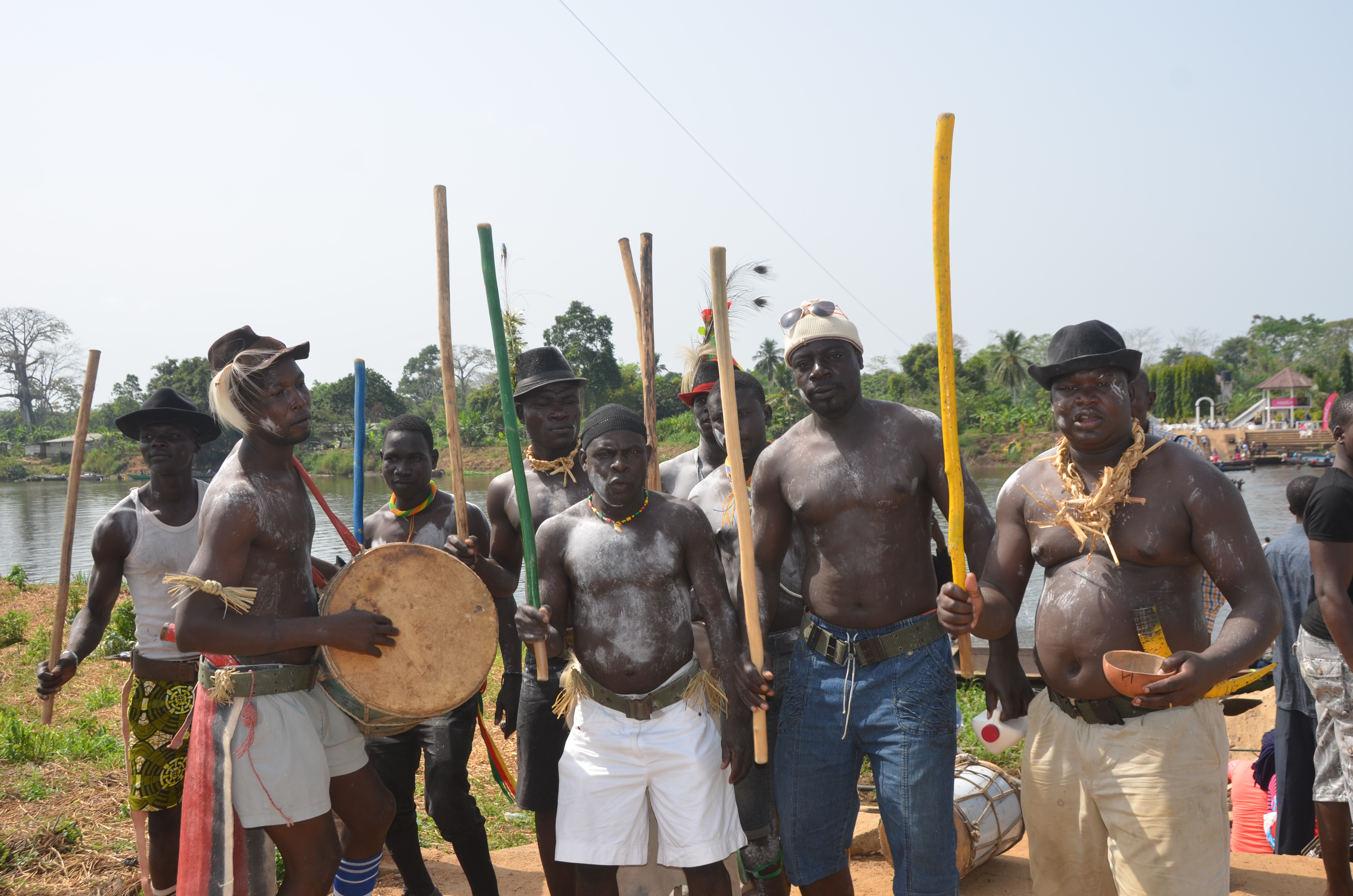
Tupuri community at Ngondo
