= Ernest W. Price =

British doctor and researcher

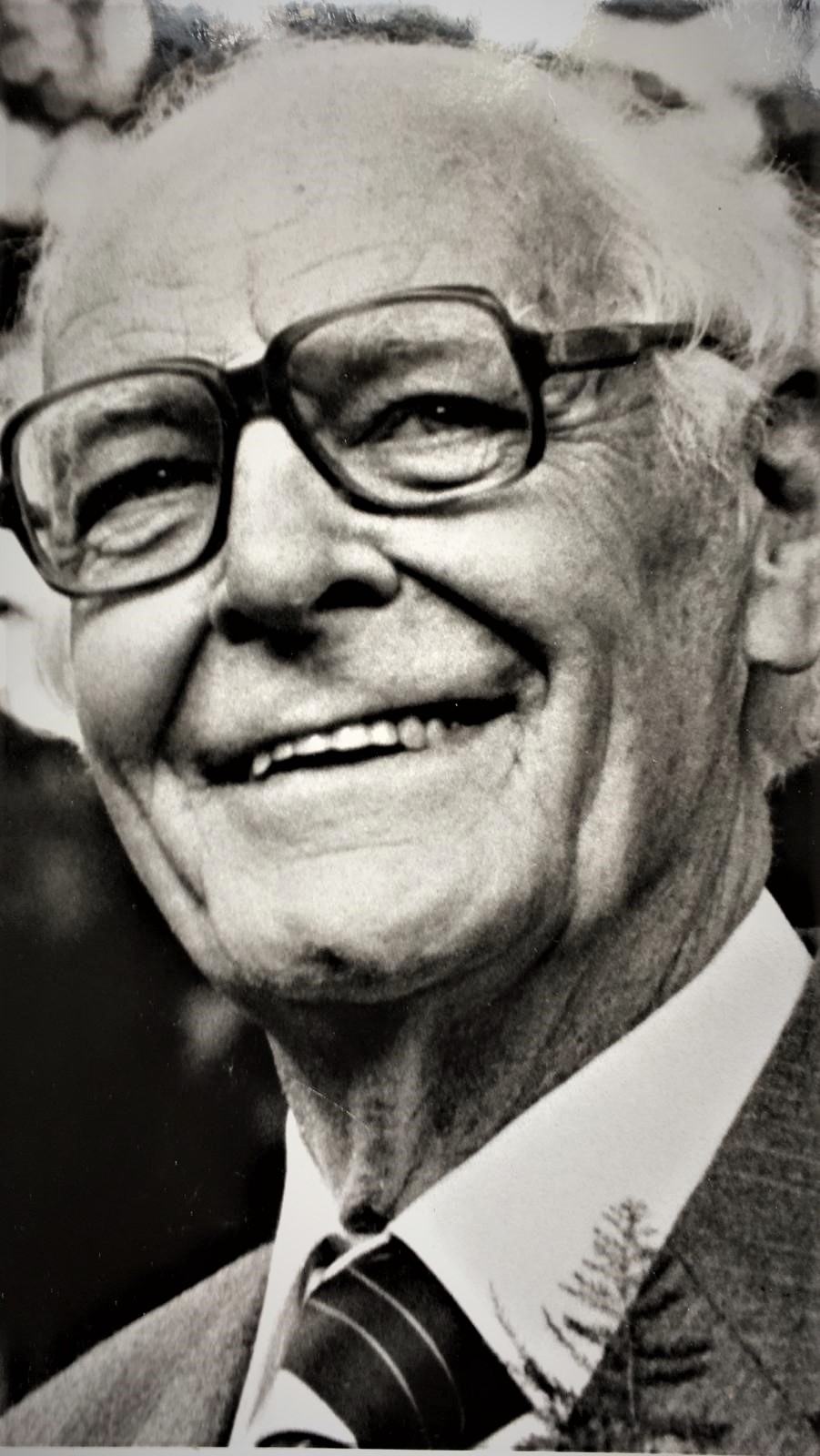
- Dr E W Price, the discoverer of Podoconiosis
- Born: 20 July 1907; Sheffield, England
- Died: 31 January 1990 (aged 82); Reepham, Norfolk, England
- Education: Calabar High School, Jamaica
- Alma mater: Charing Cross Hospital, London
- Known for: Discoverer of Podoconiosis
- Spouse: Dorothy Marjorie Williams
- Parent(s): Rev. Ernest Price and Edith Letitia Woodward

Dr Ernest Woodward Price MD, FRCSE, DTM&H, OBE (20 July 1907 – 31 January 1990) was a British missionary doctor, orthopaedic surgeon, leprosy specialist and the discoverer of podoconiosis, one of the neglected tropical diseases. A list of his publications is available online.

== Early life ==
He was born in Sheffield to Baptist missionary parents, Rev. Ernest (born 1874) and Edith Letitia (née Woodward) Price. When he was three years old, the family moved to Kingston, Jamaica, where his father had been appointed headmaster of Calabar High School, a boarding school for the sons of Baptist ministers working in rural areas of Jamaica.

== Education ==
With his two brothers, Neville Grenville Price born 26 May 1911 (later a teacher) and Bernard Henry Price born 27 January 1913 (later a surgeon), he went to his father's school, Calabar High School. From there all three brothers went to Cambridge University. Price attended St John's College from 1926 to 1929. He trained in medicine at Charing Cross Hospital from 1929 to 1933. In 1935, he went with the Baptist Missionary Society as a missionary doctor to Pimu hospital in the Belgian Congo (now the Democratic Republic of the Congo), after gaining his diploma in tropical medicine and hygiene (15 October 1934 – 31 January 1935) at the Institute of Tropical Medicine Antwerp.

== Personal life ==
Price met his wife, Dorothy Marjorie Williams (known as Marjorie) (born 23 March 1915, Streatham, London) in 1947 while on a sabbatical in the UK. They were married on 24 July 1947 at Seaford Baptist church, Sussex. She too was a Baptist missionary and had been working as a nurse at Yakusu mission hospital, DRC. They had two children; Michael Ernest Price, born Kimpese DRC 2 April 1953 (GP) and adopted a daughter in 1955. Price did not retire to the UK until 1974 when he received his OBE and became a member of the Ethiopian Order of Menelik II. He died aged 82 in Reepham, Norfolk.

== Baptist missionary, Belgian Congo 1935–1956 ==
He was at Pimu Hospital, Province of Équateur until 1946, most of the time as the only doctor there (TLM, The Leprosy Mission started working there in 1944). He remained in the Belgian Congo in World War II. In 1930 there had been 30 Protestant missionaries in the Congo, but by 1939 only five, including Price, were left. Although Belgium had been invaded by the Nazis, the Belgian government in exile in London continued to control the Congo and its valuable resources. In 1944 he published a paper on the grammar of the Ngombe language (one of the languages of Equateur Province) and thereafter contributed to the updating of the British and Foreign Bible Society's 1930 Ngombe New Testament, which was republished in 1956.

In 1947 he was sent on a sabbatical to the UK by the Baptist Missionary Society to specialise as an orthopaedic surgeon (FRCS Ed. 1947).

Returning to the Congo he went first to Sona Bata mission (part of the American Foreign Baptist Mission Society (A.F.B.M.S.), now American Baptist International Ministries), which already had a medical aide training school, and where he was tasked with helping to build Kimpese hospital. This hospital was set up by the Protestant missions in the Congo as an interdenominational training hospital for medical auxiliaries. A Protestant hospital at Kimpese had first been mooted in 1923 (there had been an Evangelical training Institute there since 1909), but was strongly resisted by the Roman Catholic Church. Before the war, the Belgian colonial government had refused to subsidise any Protestant educational enterprise, even the training of medical aides (the sole exception was the BMS medical aides training school at Yakusu). After the war this policy was reversed by the Socialist governments of Achille Van Acker and Protestant establishments were subsidised on the same basis as Catholic ones. As a result, the Protestant IME (Institut Medical Evangelique) Kimpese could be opened. He was at IME Kimpese as an orthopaedic surgeon 1947-1956. He was succeeded in this post, as he had been at Pimu, by David Hedley Wilson, later the first President of the Royal College of Emergency Medicine. Another doctor, who worked at Pimu as a BMS missionary in the 1980s, was Adrian Hopkins, later famous as an ophthalmologist and specialist in onchocerciasis (river blindness). The high standards of training and medical services at IME Kimpese became well-known in the region. During this time, Price developed an interest in the rehabilitation of leprosy patients.

== Nigerian Colonial Medical Service 1957–1959 ==
In 1957 Price was appointed to the Colonial Medical Service of the then Eastern Region, Nigeria later Biafra. He worked in orthopaedic surgery on the rehabilitation of leprosy patients. He was based first at Uzuakoli leprosarium and Research centre, where Frank Davey was working on the new Dapsone treatment of leprosy. He then moved to the Oji River leprosarium where set up a shoe making workshop. During this time, he wrote scientific papers about the natural history, treatment and prevention of plantar ulcers in leprosy. These papers formed the basis of his M.D. (Cantab.) 1961.

As his obituary in the Leprosy Review reads, "This work, together with the work concurrently being undertaken by Dr Paul Brand and his colleagues in India, had a revolutionary impact on ideas about concerning the aetiology and treatment of ulcers occurring in neuropathic feet.". However the distinguished Indian leprologist Hariharan Srinivasan, writing in 1968, gave Price sole credit for elucidating the cause of plantar ulcers, not mentioning Paul Brand. Price's African patients walked barefoot and he found that wearing soles made of wood could prevent the recurrence of these ulcers, once they had been healed. Price's career in Nigeria was cut short by a serious car accident. He then spent three years (1959–1962) as an NHS consultant pathologist at East Birmingham hospital, now Heartlands Hospital.

== Leprosy work in Ethiopia, 1962–1974 ==
In 1962 Price moved to Ethiopia where he was to have a key role in leprosy treatment, control and rehabilitation over the next twelve years. Initially he was effectively in charge of leprosy work in Ethiopia, based at the Princess Zenebework Hospital and leprosarium. This changed after the formation of ALERT (All Africa Leprosy Rehabilitation and Training Center) in Addis Ababa in 1965. He then became chief of the Leprosy Control Project, Imperial Ethiopian Ministry of Public Health, Addis Ababa, though still maintaining other responsibilities. As the famous leprologist Stanley George Browne wrote: "Earlier attempts had been made to treat people without disrupting their daily lives. Dr E W Price ... reported on a novel approach to leprosy control, which he called a 'market saturation' approach. He treated people on market days, when they gathered in their market places. This suited a country with a scattered population, poor communications and rudimentary health services." During this time, he also undertook various short-term consultancies throughout the world on behalf of WHO.

== Research fellow, Faculty of Infectious and Tropical Diseases, London School of Hygiene & Tropical Medicine, 1972 ==
During his time in Ethiopia, Dr Price became interested in nonfilarial elephantiasis (now known as podoconiosis), a widespread problem in Ethiopia as well as elsewhere in Africa, and the cause of significant disability. In this field he made important contributions, pioneering methods for the alleviation of swelling and prevention of its occurrence. His efforts to elucidate the cause of this problem continued after he retired from Ethiopia in 1974, and shortly before he died his extensive monograph on this topic was accepted for publication.

Since its publication, Price has been widely recognised as the discover of podoconiosis. The disease itself has been recognised by the World Health Organization as an "important neglected tropical disease", and there is a research group led by Gail Davey based in the Wellcome Trust Brighton and Sussex Centre for Global Health Research devoted to this disease. Davey also founded the charity Footwork, The International Podoconiosis Initiative.

Price died on 31 January 1990, aged 82, in Reepham, Norfolk.
