= Calabar High School =

Calabar high school

Location
- 61 Red Hills Road; Kingston, 20; Jamaica; 18.0289037°N 76.8094218°W

Information
- Other names: C-Bar, Rabalac
- Type: Secondary school
- Motto: The Utmost for the Highest
- Religious affiliation: Christianity
- Established: 12 September 1912; 114 years ago
- Founder: Revds. Ernest Price and David Davis
- Principal: Sian Wilson
- Grades: 7-13
- Gender: Male
- Hours in school day: Approx. 7
- Houses: Sparta; Rome; Athens; Corinth; Troy
- Colors: Green and Black
- Publication: Chronicles of Rabalac
- Yearbook: The Green and Black Review
- Website: www.calabarhighschool.com

Calabar High School is an all-male secondary school in Kingston, Jamaica. It was established by the Jamaica Baptist Union in 1912 for the children of Baptist ministers.It was named after the Kalabari Kingdom later anglicized by the British to Calabar, in present-day Nigeria. It has produced at least five Rhodes Scholars, and is respected for its outstanding performance in track and field.

== History ==
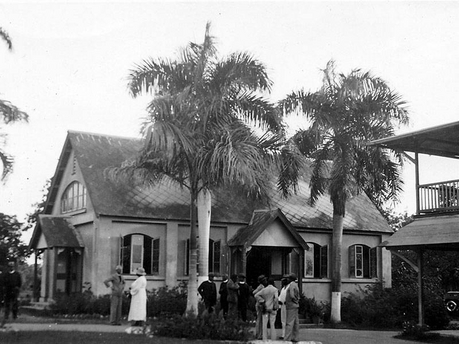
Calabar High School chapel

Early beginnings

In 1839, William Knibb, Thomas Burchell and James Phillippo, the three leading English Baptist missionaries working in Jamaica, worked to create a college to train native Baptist ministers. Out of this effort, Calabar Theological College was founded in 1843, sited in the village of Calabar, near Rio Bueno in Trelawny Parish. The British named Calabar after the Kalabari Kingdom in Nigeria of the same name.

In 1868, Calabar College was removed to East Queen Street, Kingston, where a "normal" school for training teachers and a high school for boys were added. Shortly afterwards, the high school was closed and the teacher-training activities ceased. This left the practising school—now Calabar All-Age on Sutton Street—and the theological college, which was relocated at Studley Park (on Slipe Pen Road) in 1904.

High school established

At the beginning of the 1900s, there were few high schools to educate the sons of the working class and the rising middle class. In September 1912, the Revds. Ernest Price and David Davies — Principal and Tutor, respectively, of Calabar Theological College, founded Calabar High School under the joint sponsorship of the Baptist Missionary Society of London and the Jamaica Baptist Union.

The high school opened 12 September 1912, with 26 boys; the foundation was laid in the Christian tradition. Rev. Price was the first headmaster. Within a year enrollment had reached 80 and the school had received government recognition. An early benefactor was Elizabeth Purscell, who in 1919 bequeathed the adjoining property on Studley Park Road in trust for the school. The school offered boarding facilities on nearby premises —the Hostel— to accommodate boys attending from outside the Corporate Area of Kingston.

Relocation

In 1952, Calabar Theological College and Calabar High School moved from their location at Studley Park to Red Hills Road, where 60 acres (240,000 m^{2}) of land (then called "Industry Pen") had been purchased for the re-siting of both institutions. At the time, this was a thinly populated, undeveloped area and many people thought the move unwise. The new school was built to house 350 boys but before long, extensions were needed. The school provided boarding facilities up to 1970. When boarding ceased, dormitories were converted to workshops.

In 1967 the Theological College moved to Mona as a part of the United Theological College of the West Indies and the High School took over the vacated space. This is the section of the premises which the boys now call "Long Island." At about this time a portion of the Calabar lands was sold, to be used for commercial and residential development. A privately run Extension School was added in 1971.

In 1978, the school adopted a shift system incorporating the day and extension schools, at the request of the Ministry of Education. There are over 1600 students on roll, with eight forms in each year group between grades 7 and 11, and four forms in grades 12 and 13 (sixth form).

Accomplishments

Major scholarships —such as the Jamaica and Rhodes Scholarships— have been awarded to Calabar students. Sports, particularly athletics, have always been important and the Inter-Schools’ Athletics Championships ("Champs") Trophy has been won 26 times since 1930.

One major accomplishment is in the Schools' Challenge Quiz, where Calabar is the only school to win the competition three consecutive years. Its team has been to six finals in one decade, the most of any school, competing in 2001, 2004, 2005, 2006, 2007 and 2012.

== Insignia ==
Motto

The school motto is "The Utmost for the Highest".

Colours

The official school colours are green and black.

Mascot

The school's mascot is a roaring lion, an homage to the school being named after the Kalabari Kingdom in present day Nigeria.

== Extracurricular activities ==
In sports the school dominates all major sporting areas, including track and field, football, basketball, cricket, badminton, and rugby. Calabar was the first school in Jamaica to have a swimming pool and won the inter-schools swimming competition repeatedly for many years. When the school was relocated to Red Hills Road in 1953, the boys helped to construct the new pool. At the Annual Boys and Girls Athletics Championships, the competition for which the school is most famous, Calabar is the only boys school to have won Champs titles in every decade since the 1930s.

== Notable alumni ==
=== Academia ===
- Winston A. Anderson, Howard Hughes Medical Institute Professor, Howard University
- Norman Girvan, former Secretary General of the Association of Caribbean States
- Franklin W. Knight, Professor Emeritus, Johns Hopkins University

=== Medicine ===
- Ernest W Price, son of the first principal, Rev. Ernst Price, medical missionary, Leprosy specialist, orthopaedic surgeon and discoverer of Podoconiosis

=== Arts and culture ===
- Carl Abrahams, painter
- Damian Beckett, singer-songwriter and actor
- John Holt, singer
- Vybz Kartel, Dancehall artiste
- Roger Mais, writer
- Keith Anthony Morrison, painter
- Wilmot Perkins, talk show host

=== Politics and law ===
- Francis Forbes, former Commissioner of Police
- John Junor, former Minister of Health
- Percival James Patterson, former Prime Minister of Jamaica
- Derrick Smith, Minister of Mining and Technology
- Donovan Williams, Member of Parliament, Kingston Central
- Robert Chin, Member of Parliament, Manchester Southern
- Delroy Williams, Mayor of Kingston, Councillor and Senator

=== Sports ===
- Andrew Kennedy, basketball player, 1996 Israeli Basketball Premier League MVP
- Herb McKenley, Olympic gold medalist sprinter and former world record holder
- Jason Morgan, Olympic discus thrower
- Nehemiah Perry, former cricketer and West Indies Cricket Board selector
- Andrew Riley, Olympic hurdler
- Josef Robertson, Olympic hurdler
- Dean Sewell, former national football player
- Maurice Smith, decathlete, World Championship silver medallist
- Chris Stokes and Dudley Stokes, members of the Jamaican Bobsled Team that inspired the movie Cool Runnings
- Dwight Thomas, Olympic gold medalist
- Warren Weir, Olympic and World Championship medalist
- Maurice Wignall, Commonwealth Games gold medalist
- Arthur Wint, Olympic Gold medallist runner and former world record holder
- Javon Francis, Olympic and World Championship silver medalist
- Christopher Taylor, Olympic Finalist and World Championship silver medalist
- Vashil Fernandez Former professional basketball player for NBA Development League and LEP Plata League

=== Other ===
- Colin Ferguson, perpetrator of the racially motivated 1993 Long Island Rail Road shooting

== Former principals ==
1912		Rev. Ernest Price	
1936	1940	Rev. Herbert	
1940		Rev. David Davis	
1963	1972	Rev. Walter Foster	
1972	1980	Arthur J Edgar	
1980	1985	Roy Atkinson	Teacher 1962-1980
1985	1995	Joseph Earle	Vice Principal 1976 -1977
1996	2002	Lloyd Brian	
2002	2012	Lincoln Thaxter	
2013	2023	Albert Corcho	
2023	Present	Sian Mahay Wilson	Vice Principal 2015-2023

== See also ==
- Jamaica High School Football Champions
- Education in Jamaica
