= Andrew Fuller =

English Baptist minister and controversialist (1754–1815)

The Reverend Andrew Fuller
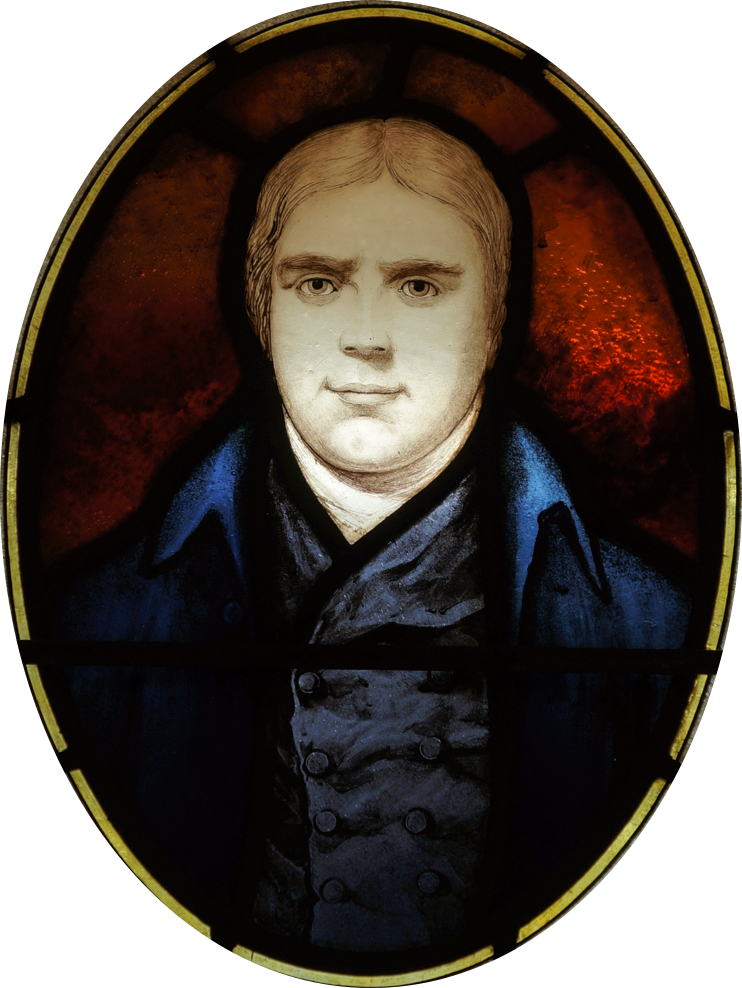
- Fuller, stained-glass portrait
- Born: 6 February 1754; Wicken, Cambridgeshire, England
- Died: 7 May 1815 (aged 61); Kettering, Northamptonshire, England

Andrew Fuller (6 February 1754 – 7 May 1815) was an English Particular Baptist minister and theologian. Known as a promoter of missionary work, he also took part in theological controversy.

== Biography ==
Fuller was born in Wicken, Cambridgeshire, and settled at Kettering, Northamptonshire. During his life, Fuller pastored two congregations – Soham (1775–1782) and Kettering (1782–1815), which is now the Fuller Baptist Church, He died on 7 May 1815 at Kettering. His son, J. G. Fuller established a printing company in Kettering, and took William Knibb as an apprentice. Knibb later became a Baptist missionary in Jamaica.

== Baptist Missionary Society ==
Fuller is best known in connection with the foundation of the Baptist Missionary Society, to which he for the most part devoted his energies. His work in promoting the missionary enterprises of the Baptist church began about 1784. A sermon published by him then, The Nature and Importance of Walking by Faith, with an appendix A Few Persuasives to a General Union in Prayer for the Revival of Religion, indirectly stimulated the movement. The Baptist Missionary Society (initially "Particular Baptist Society for Propagating the Gospel among the Heathen") was formed at Kettering in 1792. William Carey, impressed by Fuller's work The Gospel Worthy of All Acceptation, became the first missionary. Fuller took on the work at home.

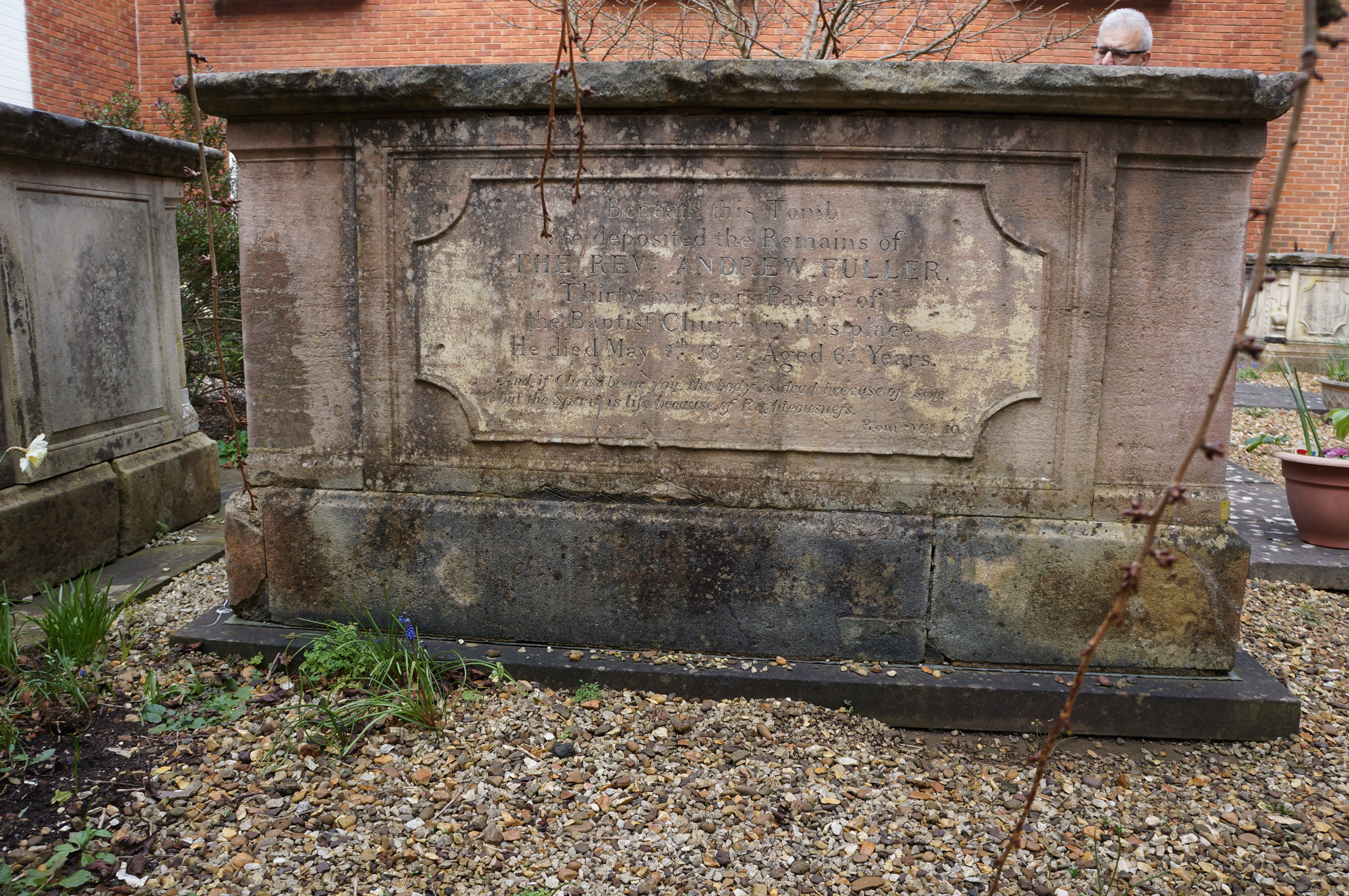
Grave of Andrew Fuller at Fuller Baptist Church, Kettering, Northamptonshire

== Views ==
Fuller, a Particular Baptist, was a controversialist in defence of the governmental theory of the atonement against hyper-Calvinism on the one hand and Socinianism and Sandemanianism on the other. Abraham Booth accused him of giving up true Calvinism. Fuller debated theology with the General Baptist Dan Taylor, but they remained on good terms.

According to Christianity Today, "'Tall, stout and muscular, a famous wrestler in his youth,' this self-taught farmer’s son became a champion for Christ, 'the most creatively useful theologian' of the Particular Baptists. His book The Gospel Worthy of All Acceptation, 1785, restated Calvinist theology for Baptists influenced by the Evangelical Revival. His Doctorate of Divinity was bestowed by Brown University, Rhode Island."

== Works ==
Fuller wrote:

- The Gospel worthy of all acceptation, or the Obligations of Men fully to credit and cordially to approve whatever God makes known.
- The Calvinistic and Socinian Systems examined and compared as to their Moral Tendency, 1794, 1796, 1802.
- The Gospel its own Witness, or the Holy Nature and Divine Harmony of the Christian Religion contrasted with the Immorality and Absurdity of Deism, 1799–1800.
- An Apology for the late Christian Missions to India.
- Memoirs of the Rev. Samuel Pearce, A.M., of Birmingham, 1800.
- Expository Discourses on Genesis, 2 vols. 1806.
- Expository Discourses on the Apocalypse, 1815.
- Sermons on Various Subjects, 1814.
- The Backslider, 1801, 1840, 1847.

Fuller also wrote pamphlets, sermons, and essays. He contributed to Charles Edward de Coetlogon's Theological Miscellany, the Evangelical Magazine, the Missionary Magazine, the Quarterly Magazine, the Protestant Dissenters' Magazine, and the Biblical Magazine. John Ryland, in his Life of Fuller, enumerated 167 articles that Fuller had contributed. Editions of his Complete Works appeared in 1838, 1840, 1845, 1852, and 1853. Joseph Belcher edited an edition in three volumes for the Baptist Publication Society of Philadelphia, and his major publications were issued with a memoir by his son in Bohn's Standard Library, 1852.

Fuller kept shorthand notes of his earlier sermons and these remained undeciphered until 2019.

== See also ==
- Deathless Sermon
- Strict Baptist
- Reformed Baptist

== The Works of Andrew Fuller ==
The eight volume "The Works of Andrew Fuller" includes volumes from the 1820, 1824, and 1825 editions.

- The Gospel Worthy of All Acceptation. Vol. I. Philadelphia: Anderson and Neehan. 1820.
- The Calvinistic and Socinian Systems. Vol. II. New Haven: S. Converse. 1824.
- The Gospel Its Own Witness. Vol. III. New Haven: S. Converse. 1824.
- Dialogues, Letters, and Essays. Vol. IV. New Haven: S. Converse. 1824.
- Expository Discourses on the Book of Genesis. Vol. V. New Haven: S. Converse. 1825.
- Expository Discourses on the Apocalypse. Vol. VI. New Haven: S. Converse. 1825.
- Sermons on Various Subjects. Vol. VII. New Haven: S. Converse. 1824.
- Miscellanies: Papers, Letters, Sermons, Tracts. Vol. VIII. New Haven: S. Converse. 1825.
