= Sam Stanley =

Sam Stanley may refer to:

- Samuel Stanley (composer), English cellist and composer of hymn tunes
- Samuel L. Stanley, American educator, biomedical researcher, and university president
- Sam Stanley (Twin Peaks), a character of Twin Peaks, portrayed by Kiefer Sutherland
- Sam Stanley (rugby union), British rugby union player
