= Deathless Sermon =

Protestant plea for missionary work

The Deathless Sermon was a sermon given as a plea for missionary work during the rise of Hyper-Calvinism in England. It was preached by Particular Baptist Minister, William Carey on 30 May, 1792 at the Friar Lane Baptist Chapel in Nottingham as an effort to arouse his pastoral contemporaries to intentional evangelistic action.

The message is rooted in the text of Isaiah 54:2-3:

Enlarge the place of thy tent, and let them stretch forth the curtains of thine habitations: spare not, lengthen thy cords, and strengthen thy stakes. For thou shalt break forth on the right hand and on the left; and thy seed shall inherit the Gentiles, and make the desolate cities to be inhabited.

No extant copies of the sermon remain; however church historians almost unanimously recognize its form as having only two points:

1. expect great things from God, and
2. attempt great things for God.

Although initially his audience was unmoved, ultimately the sermon was remarkably successful. His oration served as the initial catalyst for the founding in 1792 of the "Particular Baptist Society for Propagating the Gospel to the Heathen" (later renamed to the Baptist Missionary Society), which would commission Carey as one of their first missionaries. Carey's activity in India is renowned and placed him firmly in history as the "father of modern missions".
