= Yakusu =

- Mission members in front of early hospital buildings, c. 1909

- Location within Democratic Republic of the Congo
- Coordinates: 0.570609°N 25.023095°E
- Country: DR Congo
- Province: Tshopo
- Time zone: UTC+2 (Central Africa Time)
- Climate: Af

Yakusu was a mission in the Democratic Republic of the Congo, on the Congo River just west and downstream of Kisangani.

== History ==
The Baptist Missionary Society mission was established between 1895 and 1896 at the highest navigable point of the Congo, just below the Stanley Falls. The Stanley Falls zone consisted of strips of land 20 kilometres (12 mi) deep along both banks of the Congo between Stanley Falls and Isangi. It was declared a free trade zone, where the state abandoned its interests to private enterprise. The people of the region included the Lokele, Turumbu, Bakumu, Wagenya, Bamanga and Tovoke.

The mission embarked on a program of educating local people, who in turn became teachers in village schools. With high demand, often the education of the teachers had to be rushed. By 1905 the mission had 3,200 pupils at 70 rural schools in the zone. Initially, the mission was on good terms with the authorities. However, as their influence grew there were rumours that the British planned to take over the region. In January 1907 the governor-general Albert Lantonnois ordered the district commissioner of the Orientale Province to take vigorous measures to counter the influence of the Protestants.

A medical mission hospital was built at the Yakusu mission in 1920. The hospital was designed by architect Arnold Chesterman and was led by his brother Dr. Clement Clapton Chesterman. Dr. Chesterman developed a network of community clinics staffed by Congolese to address the epidemic of sleeping sickness. The mission treated numerous tropical diseases. In 1938 with the work of Stanley George Browne it became a leprosarium.

During the colonial era from the 1930s to the 1960s Yakusu was a center of missionary and medical activity. Nurses were trained as both evangelists and health assistants. In the early 1930s the local Mbole people began to be pressed into working on plantations and building roads. The Yakusu doctors were no longer allowed to use porters, and instead took to motorbikes, while the nurses used bicycles. There was a leprosarium across the river at Yalisombo.

== Missionaries ==
- Sir Clement Clapton Chesterman (1920-1936)
- Sir Stanley George Browne (1936-1958)
- John F. Carrington (1938-1950)

== In media ==
The film The Nun's story starring Audrey Hepburn was partially shot at Yakusu in 1958.

== Sources ==
- Dyson, Freeman (10 March 2011). "How We Know". The New York Review of Books.
- Hunt, Nancy Rose (1999). A colonial lexicon of birth ritual, medicalization, and mobility in the Congo. Duke University Press. ISBN 0-8223-2366-4.
- Marchal, Jules; Delathuy, A. M. (1996). E.D. Morel contre Léopold II (in French). Editions L'Harmattan. ISBN 2-7384-2856-8.
- Smith, H. Sutton (1911). Yakusu: The very heart of Africa. Marshall Brothers.
- Vinck, Honoré (1954). "Un livre de lecture française du Congo Belge".
- "Wellcome Library for the History of Medicine & Understanding". Leprosy History.
