= John Brine =

English Baptist minister (1703–1765)

John Brine (1703–1765) was an English Particular Baptist minister.

== Life ==
Born in Kettering, Northamptonshire, Brine was called into the ministry by the church at Kettering and after occasional preaching there for some time, he received a call to become pastor at a Particular Baptist church at Coventry.

In 1730, he received a call to succeed William Morton, as pastor of the Baptist congregation at Curriers' Hall, Cripplegate, in London. His ministry continued there for the next thirty-five years during which time he took a principal lead in all the public activities and dialogue that concerned the Particular Baptist denomination. He died on 21 February 1765 and he was buried in Bunhill Fields cemetery. Although he left orders that no special funeral sermon should be preached for him, his friend, Dr John Gill did take that occasion to preach a sermon to his own congregation from 1 Corinthians 15:10 - By the grace of God I am what I am.

== Works ==
They include:

- The Christian Religion not destitute of Arguments, &c. … in answer to "Christianity not founded on Argument," 1743.
- The Certain Efficacy of the Death of Christ asserted, 1743.
- A Vindication of Natural and Revealed Religion, in answer to Mr. James Foster, 1746. Attacks James Foster.
- A Treatise on various subjects: controversial tracts against Bragge, Johnson, Tindal, Jackson, Eltringham, and others (in 2 vols.), 1750, 1756, 1766. Against Robert Bragge, John Johnson, William Eltringham, and others. A popular work, it was edited by James Upton in 1813, with some of Brine's sermons added, and a life of the author prefixed (from Walter Wilson).
- Discourses at a Monthly Exercise of Prayer, at Wednesday and Lord's Day Evening Lectures, and Miscellaneous Discourses (2 vols.);
- Funeral and Ordination Sermons and Choice Experience of Mrs. Anne Brine, with Dr. Gill's Sermon at her Funeral, 1750. Collected together, his pamphlets fill eight volumes octavo.
- Imputation of Christ's Active Obedience to his People, and the Merit of it Demonstrated, in a Sermon, Preached to the Society, who Support the ... 27 December 1758

A complete catalogue of Brine's separate publications is given by Walter Wilson in his Dissenting Churches.
