= Elephantiasis nostras =

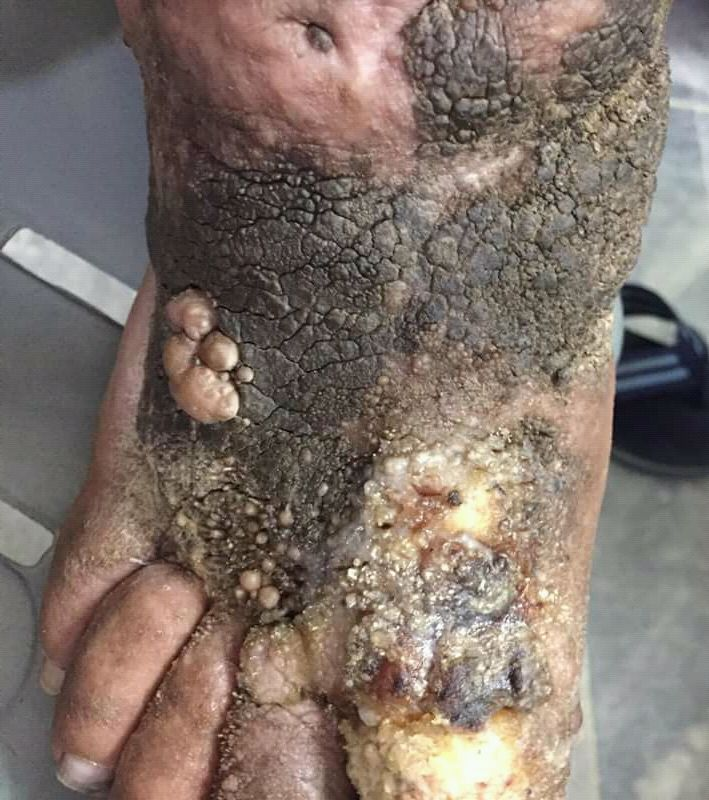
- Specialty: Dermatology

Elephantiasis nostras, also known as "Holliman's Edema," is a disease that usually affects the lower legs or scrotum. Swelling is accompanied by rough nodules or wart-like plaques on the skin. If the disease is not treated, it eventually results in pain and immobility.

The disease can be described as a cutaneous condition, a final hypertrophic fibrosis following long standing chronic lymphangitis.

== Causes ==
Although elephantiasis nostras resembles the elephantiasis caused by helminths, it is not a filarial disease. Instead, it is a complication of chronic lymphedema. Both elephantiasis nostras and filarial elephantiasis are characterized by impaired lymphatic drainage, which results in excess fluid accumulation.

== Treatment ==
Treatment consists of antibiotics, elevation of the affected limb, and compression. For persons with elephantiasis nostras who are overweight or obese, weight loss is recommended. Oral retinoids have been used to treat the cutaneous manifestations of the disease.

== See also ==
- Chronic lymphangitis
- Elephantiasis
- Skin lesion
- List of cutaneous conditions
