= Andrew Kennedy (basketball) =

American basketball player (born 1965)

Personal information
- Born: December 22, 1965 (age 60) Kingston, Jamaica
- Listed height: 6 ft 7 in (2.01 m)
- Listed weight: 207 lb (94 kg)

Career information
- High school: Calabar (Kingston, Jamaica)
- College: Amarillo College (1983–1985); Virginia (1985–1987)
- NBA draft: 1987: 2nd round, 43rd overall pick
- Drafted by: Philadelphia 76ers
- Playing career: 1987–2002
- Position: Small forward

Career history
- 1987–1988: Topeka Sizzlers
- 1988–1989: Rapid City Thrillers
- 1989: CB Valladolid
- 1989–1990: Hapoel Galil Elyon
- 1990–1991: Corona Cremona
- 1991–1993: Hapoel Galil Elyon
- 1993–1994: Montpellier Basket
- 1995–1998: Hapoel Galil Elyon
- 1998–2000: Maccabi Haifa BC
- 2001–2002: Bnei Herzliya
- 2002: Ironi Ramat Gan

Career highlights
- Israeli Basketball Premier League MVP (1996); All-CBA Second Team (1989); Second-team All-ACC (1987)
- Stats at Basketball Reference

Andrew Fitzgarfield Kennedy (born December 22, 1965) is a retired American-Jamaican basketball player, most notable for his years playing in the Israeli league, with Hapoel Galil Elyon's successful teams of the early 1990s. He was the 1996 Israeli Basketball Premier League MVP.

== Biography ==
Kennedy attended Calabar High School in Kingston, Jamaica in 1978–83, and participated in a number of sports including table tennis, athletics, and basketball. He was an above-average student, and regularly won awards for excellence and school citizenship. He was drawn to basketball, where he played on the B and later A team. Of note was the rivalry between Kennedy and his older brother Michael Kennedy, who played basketball for Kingston College, Calabar's archrival. The two met on numerous occasions.

A 6' 7" forward, Kennedy studied at the University of Virginia and after graduating he was picked in the 1987 NBA draft by the Dallas Mavericks as the 43rd pick overall.

Kennedy played in the Continental Basketball Association (CBA) for the Topeka Sizzlers and Rapid City Thrillers from 1987 to 1989. He was selected to the All-CBA Second Team in 1989.

He arrived to the Upper Galilee, Israel (Galil Elyon) in 1989 and played for the local team of Hapoel Galil Elyon for seven seasons in three teams, in his first four seasons winning a national cup in 1992 and an historic championship a year later in 1993. He was the 1996 Israeli Basketball Premier League MVP. To this day he holds the record for most seasons played in Israel by an import player, a total of 12, in six teams.

Kennedy later played in Italy, Spain, and France before his retirement in 2005.
