= Samuel Stanley (composer) =

English composer (1767–1822)

Samuel Stanley (1767–1822) was an English cellist and composer of hymn tunes.

Born in Birmingham, he was precentor (leader of the choir) at Carr's Lane Chapel until 1818, when he and some of that congregation moved to Ebenezer Chapel in Steelhouse Lane. He was a cellist in the Birmingham Theatre Orchestra, and he played at the Birmingham Triennial Music Festivals of 1799, 1802 and 1817. He also kept the Crown Tavern in Great Charles Street.

He published two books of hymn tunes during his lifetime: Twenty Four Tunes in Four Parts (1802) and Nineteen Psalm, Hymn, & Charity Hymn Tunes (c. 1804). In 1805, he also published Two Psalm Tunes. After his death, a third book was published, Sacred Music, Comprising Twenty New Psalm & Hymn Tunes (c. 1825). The three books were re-issued c. 1830. Some tunes from his first book still appear in hymnals today, such as "Warwick", "Shirland", "Doversdale", "Stonefield" and "Calvary". The Christmas hymn "Star of Bethlehem", from Stanley's second book, with words by Jehoiada Brewer, is still sung as part of the Sheffield carol tradition, as well as being claimed as a Cornish carol.
