= Samuel Pearce =

British Baptist minister and hymnwriter

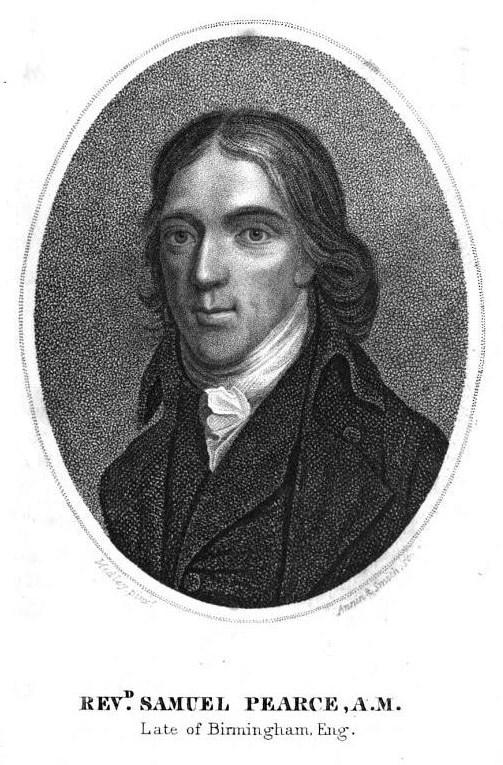
Samuel Pearce

Samuel Pearce (1766– 10 October 1799) was an English Baptist minister, known as a hymn-writer.

== Life ==
The son of a silversmith, Pearce was born at Plymouth, Devon, on 20 July 1766. He studied at the Baptist College, Bristol, and in 1790 was appointed minister of Cannon Street Baptist Church, Birmingham, where he remained The ordination service on 18 August 1790 gathered Caleb Evans, Edward Edmonds, Andrew Fuller, Robert Hall, the elder, and John Ryland. Pearce's house in St Paul's Square, Birmingham was wrecked in 1791 by a "Church and King" riot, in his absence.

Pearce became interested in overseas mission work through hearing Thomas Coke preach. He met William Carey, certainly by 1791 when he preached at the ordination service for Carey in Leicester. He was one of the 12 ministers who, at Kettering on 2 October 1792, signed the resolutions founding the Baptist Missionary Society. In the hope of mission work, Pearce began to study Bengali.

In 1793 Pearce received an honorary degree, from Brown University. From 1797 he was quite ill, with tuberculosis. For a time he had assistance from William Ward.

Pearce died on 10 October 1799. Jehoiada Brewer and John Ryland preached at the funeral.

== Works ==
In Pearce's Memoirs, edited by Andrew Fuller, London, 1800, there were 11 poetical pieces, some of which were included in nonconformist hymnals.

Pearce published a radical pamphlet in 1790, The Oppressive, Unjust and Prophane Nature, and Tendency of the Corporation and Test Acts.He was the first editor of the Periodical Accounts of Baptist missionary work.

== Family ==
In 1791 Pearce married Sarah, daughter of Joshua Hopkins of Alcester. William Hopkins Pearce, missionary in India, was their son. Anna, their daughter, married Jonathan, son of William Carey.

== Sources ==
- Betteridge, Alan (2010). Deep Roots, Living Branches: A History of Baptists in the English Western Midlands. Troubador Publishing. ISBN 978-1-84876-277-0.
- Whelan, Timothy D. (2009). Baptist Autographs in the John Rylands University Library of Manchester. Mercer University Press. ISBN 978-0-88146-144-2.
- This article incorporates text from a publication now in the public domain: Lee, Sidney, ed. (1895). "Pearce, Samuel". Dictionary of National Biography. Vol. 44. London: Smith, Elder & Co.
