= Fuller Baptist Church =

Baptist church in Kettering, Northamptonshire, England

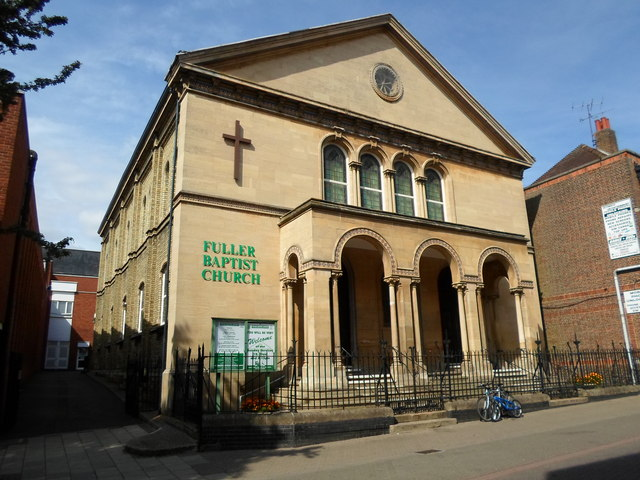

Fuller Baptist Church is a Baptist church located in the town of Kettering in northern Northamptonshire, England. This church was organized over 300 years ago, and has contributed to the creation of a number of Baptist churches nearby. It is Grade II listed.

== Founding ==
The origins of the Fuller Baptist church stretch back as far as 1666, when the first Nonconformist meetings commenced in Kettering following the Act of Uniformity 1662. This was when Mr Maydwell, the Rector of Kettering, left the Parish Church to establish the Independent Meeting.

The first entry, in the Old Church Book, which is undated, lists amongst its members a Mr William Wallis who, with six other members, was dismissed from membership for being an Anabaptist. In October 1696 these men set up their own fellowship in a house in Bayley's Yard, Newland Street, with William Wallis as their pastor, and this formed the first Baptist Church in Kettering, and from which the Fuller Church ultimately grew.

At about the same time a second Baptist fellowship was established in Goosepasture Lane (now Meadow Road) under the leadership of Mr Wills, formerly pastor of the Independent Meeting but who also had been dismissed from membership. Around 1729 the two separate Baptist meetings merged, meeting together for worship on the common basis of believers baptism and open communion.

The church soon was in need of its own burial ground but the buildings in Goosepasture Lane had little or no land attached. Mr Beeby Wallis (the great-grandson of William Wallis the pastor), made available to the church his house, warehouse, barn, stable yard and gardens situated in Gold Street; this property was worth a total of £350, but was bought by the church for £139 14s 9d.

By 1775 under the leadership of George Moreton of Arnesby, the membership had risen to 75. However, not long after Mr Moreton was forced to give his resignation due to ill health, and a young minister named Andrew Fuller was approached. Fuller was minister at Soham at the time and was reluctant to leave his small flock, but after consulting with nine of his fellow ministers, Fuller eventually and reluctantly accepted the call and, together with his family, moved to Kettering in October 1782.

== Enlargement ==
Andrew Fuller brought life and vigour to the church. He was a prolific writer and a powerful preacher. By 1786 it was considered necessary to enlarge the Chapel at a cost of £133. In the same year a daughter church - Gretton Chapel - became independent of the Kettering church.

In 1792 Fuller helped in the creation of what was to become the Baptist Missionary Society, but it was also the year Beeby Wallis and Fuller's own wife died.

Two years later Fuller married Ann Coles, the daughter of the Reverend William Coles of Ampthill and found in his new wife "the perfect helpmeet". By 1805 a further rebuilding of the chapel was required, and the building was lengthened by 18 feet and the walls raised by 4 feet, and now could contain 900 people. Fuller died on Sunday, 7 May 1815. It was estimated that 2000 people attended his funeral. Fuller was succeeded by his assistant, John Keen Hall, who died in 1829 at the age of 43.

In 1851 the Sunday School had 534 children attending on Sunday mornings and 625 in the afternoon. Gas lighting was introduced into the Chapel in 1846. Revd James Mursell, whose ministry began in March 1853, had an "exciting and innovative" ministry. It was during his time that the new chapel was built. The Fuller Chapel, as it was named, opened for worship on 24 September 1861.

James Mursell served until January 1870. By 1884 the membership had risen to 410. In July 1891 the foundation stone of a mission hall in Nelson Street was laid, which became what is now known as Carey Memorial Chapel. By 1896 membership of Fuller stood at 720 with a Sunday School of around 2000 children. In 1945 another church plant in Rockingham Road gained its independence (Rockingham Road Baptist Church) and yet another (Corby) became independent in 1956.

== Modern usage ==
In 1996 Fuller Baptist Church celebrated its 300th anniversary with a varied programme of events, including organ recitals, Sports Day, and evangelistic outreach. Outreach continues through church activities and the Fuller Coffee House.
