= Wilmot Perkins =

Wilmot 'Motty' Perkins
- Born: Wilmot Perkins; 3 September 1931; Portland, Jamaica
- Status: Married
- Died: February 10, 2012 (aged 80); St. Andrew, Jamaica
- Other names: Motty, Mutty
- Education: Calabar High School
- Occupations: Radio host and Journalist
- Years active: 1960–2012
- Spouse: Elaine Perkins
- Career
- Show: Perkins On Line; Straight Talk; Hot Line; Public Eye; What's your Grouse
- Stations: JR (Radio Jamaica); JBC (Jamaica Broadcasting Corporation); KLAS FM 89; Hot 102 FM; Power 106 FM

Wilmot 'Motty' Perkins (3 September 1931 – 10 February 2012) was a Jamaican radio personality and was the longest serving talk show host on Jamaican radio.

== Background ==
He was born and raised in the parish of Portland, Jamaica and attended Calabar High School, in Kingston. He died at his home just after 1 am on 10 February 2012, aged 80. He is survived by his wife of 56 years, Elaine, and grandsons Jamie and Eden.

== Career ==
=== Radio ===
Wilmot Perkins began his radio career hosting the program What's your Grouse on RJR in 1960. He then took a break from the airwaves a few years later to go into farming, but returned to radio in the 1970s, as host of Jamaica Broadcasting Corporation's (JBC) popular call-in program Public Eye. He later hosted Hot Line on RJR and then Straight Talk on KLAS FM 89, before hosting Perkins On Line on Hot 102 FM.

In April 2002, he took his program Perkins On Line to Power 106 FM. With his probing interviews and keen analyses of current events, the program made for compulsive listening. Perkins On Line is spirited interaction with callers on a wide range of topics. It is described by many as "The Poor Man's University." A typical caller will often attribute his or her widening knowledge of events happening in and outside of Jamaica to the information garnered from just listening to these broadcasts.

Perkins said the program aimed to "focus public attention on the gaping hiatus between what is and what might be, and to do it within a broad framework that embraces not only the history of Jamaica, but the history of mankind."

=== Controversy ===
Some often disagreed with Perkins, but he revelled in controversy and these calls added spice. He said that "if people really think about it, they might discover that 'Perkins on Line' is more profoundly positive than negative." That's why it was called the "Thinking Persons' call-in show".

Perkins was sued 28 times for libel or slander but none of the suits was tried or settled out of court. All were dropped by the plaintiffs, who included former Prime Minister Michael Manley and, most recently, wealthy businessman Gordon 'Butch' Stewart, owner of the Jamaica Observer Newspaper:

On 5 August 2009, the Jamaica Observer reported that he was being sued by Stewart for defamation. The matter is currently before the Jamaican court.

On 19 July 2010, The Jamaica Observer reported that Mr. Perkins has been slapped with a second lawsuit for libel by Sandals Resorts Chairman Butch Stewart. Mr. Perkins is being sued for damages arising from the reproduction of a speech on his radio call-in show Perkins On Line on Power 106 FM. The speech was originally made in the Parliament of Jamaica by Member of Parliament Andrew Gallimore on 28 June 2005.

=== Newspaper ===
Wilmot Perkins has vast experience as a parliamentary reporter, a news editor and columnist working at the Jamaica Gleaner.
