= Hyper-Calvinism =

Branch of Protestant theology

Hyper-Calvinism is an offshoot of Protestant theology that places a strong emphasis on God's sovereignty at the expense of human responsibility. It is at times regarded as a variation of Calvinism, but critics emphasize its differences from traditional Calvinistic beliefs. Hyper-Calvinism distinguishes itself from traditional Calvinism when it comes to the "sufficiency and efficiency" of Christ's atonement. Predestination in Calvinism traditionally argues that only the elect are able to understand Christ's atonement, but that the sufficiency of the atonement stretches to all humanity, while Hyper-Calvinism argues the atonement is sufficient only to the elect.

The term originated in the 19th century as a sometimes-pejorative descriptor predated by terms such as "false Calvinism" and "High Calvinism". The term can be used vaguely, and its distinction from traditional Calvinism is not always clear; writers such as Jim Ellis have suggested that Hyper-Calvinism as a concept is sometimes applied broadly to denominations more theologically conservative than the speaker's, rather than to a consistent theological stance. Nonetheless, Hyper-Calvinism is distinguished as a distinct theological viewpoint, associated with figures such as the 18th-century theologian John Gill.

== Definitions ==
Peter Toon notes that the expression "Hyper-Calvinism" came to be generally used in the 19th century, while the terms "False Calvinism" and "High Calvinism" were used near the end of the 18th century to define the same doctrinal views. "High Calvinism" has sometimes been used as a synonym for Hyper-Calvinism, and at other times as a synonym for the Calvinism of the Canons of Dort (1619). Although the doctrine of limited atonement is taught in the Canons of Dort, the term "Hyper-Calvinism" in previous generations has been used to define those who reject the view that the atonement is sufficient for all mankind or that there is a general design in the death of Christ.

=== Historic definitions of the term ===
In his publication from 1825, George Croft defined Hyper-Calvinism as holding to a particular design of Christ's death and denying a general design. He also notes that Hyper-Calvinists were generally styled High-Calvinists because they had views above genuine Calvinism: denying that the death of Christ was "in any respect" intended for the salvation of all, not inviting all to believe in Christ for salvation, contending that invitations should only be given to the "willing", and holding to antinomian doctrines, which tend to discourage holiness. In a Protestant Dictionary from 1904, Charles Neil defined Hyper-Calvinism as a view that maintains the theory of limited atonement and limits the scope of gospel invitations to the elect.

=== Modern definitions of the term ===
Modern definitions of Hyper-Calvinism usually distinguish it from points of Calvinism, such as limited atonement or supralapsarianism. There is not, however, unanimity regarding the definition.

Curt Daniel defines Hyper-Calvinism as "that school of supralapsarian Five Point Calvinism which so stresses the sovereignty of God by overemphasizing the secret [will of God] over the revealed will [of God] and eternity over time, that it minimizes the responsibility of Man, notably with respect to the denial of the word ‘offer’ in relation to the preaching of the Gospel of a finished and limited atonement, thus undermining the universal duty of sinners to believe savingly with assurance that the Lord Jesus Christ died for them." Daniel goes on to suggest that the real difference between "High" and "Hyper-" Calvinism is the word "offer"

Iain Murray adopts a different approach, putting the emphasis on the denial of a "universal command to repent and believe" and the assertion "that we have only warrant to invite to Christ those who are conscious of a sense of sin and need."

Jim Ellis argues that "adequately defining what constitutes the fundamental error of hyper-Calvinism" is problematic because many definitions "blur the distinction between it and legitimate Calvinism", and most of them include an apparent bias against Five Point Calvinism. Ellis goes on to say that Hyper-Calvinism "consists of two fundamental errors: a denial of duty-faith and a resultant denial of the universal call of the gospel."

== Adherents ==
The term "Hyper-Calvinist" is sometimes used as a pejorative; Jim Ellis suggests that "it seems as if anyone to the right of one's own theological position is fair game to be labeled a hyper-Calvinist." Notwithstanding this, people who have been described as Hyper-Calvinists include John Skepp (d. 1721), Lewis Wayman (d. 1764), John Brine (d. 1765), and John Gill (d. 1771). Additionally, The Gospel Coalition described the Westboro Baptist Church of Fred Phelps as a Hyper-Calvinist church.

David Engelsma notes that his own denomination, the Protestant Reformed Churches in America, has been labelled as "Hyper-Calvinist" for its rejection of the "well-meant offer of the gospel". Engelsma disputes this label, and says that Hyper-Calvinism is instead "the denial that God in the preaching of the gospel calls everyone who hears the preaching to repent and believe... that the church should call everyone in the preaching... that the unregenerated have a duty to repent and believe."

== Differences from orthodox Calvinism ==
=== Hyper-Calvinism doctrine ===
The beliefs which have been termed "Hyper-Calvinism" may be seen in historic writings of numerous Calvinistic ministers and in the Gospel Standard Articles of Faith (See Articles 24, 26, 27, 28 and 29). The Hyper-Calvinism of these articles arose in part as a reaction to the Amyraldism of men like Richard Baxter. According to J. I. Packer, Baxter "devised an eclectic middle route between Reformed, Arminian, and Roman doctrines of grace: interpreting the kingdom of God in terms of contemporary political ideas, he explained Christ's death as an act of universal redemption (penal and vicarious, but not substitutionary), in virtue of which God has made a new law offering pardon and amnesty to the penitent. Repentance and faith, being obedience to this law, are the believer's personal saving righteousness."

==== The Gospel Standard Articles of Faith and statements by ministers ====
Denial of sufficient grace in the atonement for all persons
Article 28 states a rejection of the general redemption view of Richard Baxter and a denial that there is a residue of grace in Christ for non-elect persons if they will only accept it. The Baptist minister Daniel Whitaker reasoned against "Baxterianism" and defined it as the teaching that Christ died intentionally for the elect only, but sufficiently for the rest. He believed that the Baxterian view allowed a possible and probable salvation for non-elect persons from the sufficiency of the death of Christ. John Stevens, also a Baptist minister, affirmed that the atonement is "insufficient" to save those whom Christ never intended to save. He reasoned that Christ has never benefited any person "unintentionally" and that his meritorious worth should not be divided or confounded.

Denial of indiscriminate offers of the gospel to all persons
Article 24 states a confession that invitations of the gospel are only for sensible sinners who are made aware of their need for Christ. Article 27 states a denial that the non-elect are ever enlightened by the Holy Spirit to receive grace. Article 29 states a confession that the gospel is to be preached in all the world without indiscriminate offers of the gospel to all. The English Baptist pastor John Gill denied that there are universal offers of grace made to any, but that grace and salvation are published and revealed in the gospel. The English Anglican Church pastor Robert Hawker contended that Jesus only invited the weary and heavy laden. He believed that it is in "direct contradiction to scripture" to invite all. He also reasoned that an attempt to offer Christ is "little short of blasphemy" and those who make invitations to allure the carnal world to faith and repentance know not the scriptures nor the power of God.

Denial of duty-faith
Article 26 states a confession that the natural man should not be given exhortation or duties to "spiritually and savingly" repent and believe. Article 26 has been a subject of controversy concerning what was intended. In his book "What Gospel Standard Baptists Believe", J.H. Gosden clarifies that this article is not meant to minimize the sin of unbelief. He understood this article to be a denial that man is duty bound to believe "each individual is himself" included in the redemption work of Christ and he affirmed that man is "inexcusable in his unbelief" against God's revealed word and works. The Baptist pastor William Styles reasoned that duty-faith blends the covenant of works with the covenant of grace and makes faith a work of the law. W. Kitchen reasoned in a Strict Baptists magazine that duty-faith would imply a universal design in the atonement by calling on all persons to exercise a faith which grants them to believe Jesus gave himself for them.

=== Orthodox Calvinistic doctrine ===
While "Hyper Calvinism" reasons that the sufficiency of the atonement extends no further than its efficiency, "Orthodox Calvinism" reasons that Christ suffered sufficiently for the whole world, but efficiently only for the elect.

==== John Calvin ====
John Calvin denied that the sins of the reprobate have been expiated, but he maintained that Christ died sufficiently for the whole world and only efficiently for the elect. He affirmed that Jesus makes his favor "common to all" and offered "indiscriminately to all", though not "extended to all"; for all do not receive him. He also stated that it is their unbelief which prevents anyone from receiving benefit from the death of Christ. With reference to God's desire concerning the reprobate wicked, Calvin condemns the view of Georgius the Sicilian that "God Would have all men to be saved" and continues by saying "It follows, therefore, according to his understanding of that passage, either that God is disappointed in His wishes, or that all men without exception must be saved … why, if such be the case, God did not command the Gospel to be preached to all men indiscriminately from the beginning of the world? why [did] He [suffer] so many generations of men to wander for so many ages in all the darkness of death?"

==== Confessions and catechisms ====
The Canons of Dort affirm an abundant sufficiency in the death of Christ of "infinite worth and value" for the whole world. The word offer or free offer was used in the Westminster Standards and the Westminster Larger Catechism leaves no room for doubt that the phrase "grace offered" is used in reference to persons who "never truly come" to Christ. In his "Question & Answers on the Shorter Catechism", John Brown addressed and answered questions concerning the free offer of the gospel; he reasoned that God commands every person that hears the gospel to "take his gift Christ out of his hand", that Christ offers himself "Fully, freely, earnestly, and indefinitely" to all persons that hear the gospel "without exception", that this offer is for every person's case "as if he was named in it" and that to embrace the offer of Christ is to be persuaded that "Christ in the promise is mine."

== Opposition to the doctrine ==
Both Calvinistic and non-Calvinistic ministers have expounded on several Bible passages as contradicting the doctrines which are considered to be Hyper-Calvinism. Verification that such scripture citations were a matter of doctrinal controversy may be seen in William Jeyes Styles' A Manual of Faith and Practice, Andrew Fuller's The Gospel Worthy of All Acceptation, John Gill's The Cause of God and Truth, Richard Baxter's Universal Redemption, Daniel Whitby's A Discourse Concerning Election and Reprobation and William Button's The Nature of Special Faith in Christ Considered. Arthur Pink wrote an article arguing for the doctrine of faith as the bounden duty of every person who hears the gospel.

=== Biblical references used in favor of orthodox Calvinism ===
- Matthew 23:37 "...how often would I have gathered thy children together, even as a hen gathereth her chickens under her wings, and ye would not!" Adam Clarke believed that here it is evident that there were persons whom Jesus "wished to save, and bled to save" who perished because they would not come unto him. Richard Baxter referred to this scripture as teaching that the cause of persons perishing is not "for want of an expiatory Sacrifice", but "for want of Faith" to receive Christ and his benefits. John Calvin reasoned from this scripture that God "calls all men indiscriminately to salvation", that he "wills to gather all to himself" and that this is distinct from his secret purpose to efficaciously gather whomsoever he wills. John Gill understood that Christ here expresses his "will for their temporal good" that they may be gathered under the ministry of his word and acknowledge him as the Messiah in order to preserve them from the "temporal ruin" threatened upon their city. He concludes that this scripture does not prove men resist the operations of God's grace, but rather reveals the "obstructions and discouragements" that were "thrown in the way" of attendance to the ministry of his word.
- John 1:7 "...that all men through him might believe." Albert Barnes noted on this scripture that John and Jesus came that "we may all" trust in Christ for salvation. John Calvin commented here that John came to prepare a church for Christ by "inviting all" to him. John Gill reasoned that the faith here required was not to believe Jesus died for them, but to acknowledge him as the Messiah. He also contended that souls who are made sensible of their lost state and "need of a Savior" ought to believe that Jesus died for them and "none but such."
- John 3:16–17 "...that the world through him might be saved." On this scripture, Richard Baxter interpreted the world which Jesus came to save to be divided into believers who will eventually be saved and unbelievers who will eventually be condemned. John Calvin stated that the word "world" is repeated here so that no man may consider himself "wholly excluded", if he only "keep the road of faith." John Gill commented here that the "world" is referring to the elect in general and in particular God's people among the gentiles.
- Romans 3:22–23 "...unto all and upon all them that believe: for there is no difference: For all have sinned..." Adam Clarke commented here that all human creatures are "equally helpless and guilty" and therefore God's "endless mercy has embraced all." John Calvin stated here that Christ "is offered to all" and becomes an advantage only to believers. He also commented that the apostle Paul here "urges on all, without exception" concerning the "necessity of seeking righteousness in Christ." John Gill understood these scriptures to refer to "not all men," but to persons who "believe in Christ for salvation" and that there is no room here for any person to "despair of the grace and righteousness of Christ" on account of viewing themselves as the worst of sinners.
- Revelation 3:20 "...if any man hear my voice, and open the door..." Albert Barnes reasoned that this scripture is "applicable to all persons" and is the method by which Jesus seeks to come into the heart of a sinner. William Styles commented that this scripture is not referring to the unconverted, but rather regenerated persons of the church at Laodicea who were in "a low and lukewarm state" showing little regard for Christ. He understood the purpose of this appeal to be "not salvation from the punishment of sin," but of communion with Christ.

Additional scriptures
John 5:34 is addressed by William Styles (A Manual of Faith and Practice, pg. 274). John 10:31 is addressed by William Styles (A Manual of Faith and Practice, pg. 245).

=== Biblical references used in favor of the concept of duty-faith ===
- Psalm 2:12 "Kiss the Son, lest he be angry..." Andrew Fuller concluded from this scripture that "unconverted sinners are commanded to believe in Christ for salvation" and that "believing in Christ for salvation is their duty." William Button understood the phrase "Kiss the Son" as a duty to reverence Christ and the phrase "Blessed are they" to be an encouragement to those who are privileged to "believe in him for pardon."
- John 12:36 "While ye have light, believe in the light, that ye may be the children of light..." Andrew Fuller stated that the belief which was required of these "unbelievers" would have "issued in their salvation." William Styles understood "believe in the light” to mean "receive my testimony concerning Myself and My mission" and that the title "children of light" intends "Jews whose minds were informed by the teaching of Jesus" and not "spiritually illuminated persons."
- 2 Corinthians 5:17–21 "...we pray you in Christ's stead, be ye reconciled to God." Andrew Fuller reasoned that this scripture is spoken to "rebellious subjects" and to not "submit" to this mercy is to maintain "the war." Albert Barnes, on this scripture, stated that "ministers of reconciliation" are to "urge this duty on their fellow-men." John Calvin commented here that the phrase "be reconciled" is addressed to believers as a daily embassy "sounded forth in the Church." John Gill commented on this scripture as referring to "new creatures" that Christ died for.
- 2 Thessalonians 1:8 "...them that know not God, and that obey not the gospel of our Lord Jesus Christ."
- 1 John 3:23 "...this is his commandment, That we should believe on the name of his Son Jesus Christ..."

Additional scriptures
Isaiah 55:6–7 is addressed by William Button (The Nature of Special Faith in Christ Considered, pg. 30). Acts 16:30–31 is addressed by John Gill (The Cause of God and Truth, p. 574).

== Support for the doctrine ==
Several bible passages are urged as supporting the doctrines which are considered to be Hyper-Calvinism. Verification that such scripture citations were a matter of doctrinal controversy may be seen in William Jeyes Styles' Baptist Manual Complete, Andrew Fuller's The Gospel Worthy of All Acceptation, John Gill's The Cause of God and Truth, Richard Baxter's Universal Redemption, Daniel Whitby's A Discourse Concerning Election and Reprobation and William Button's The Nature of Special Faith in Christ Considered.

=== Biblical references used to support the position of gospel invitations going to certain persons only ===
- Isaiah 55:1 "Ho, every one that thirsteth, come ye to the waters..." John Gill taught that the persons here under the description of "thirsty" are spiritual persons "thirsting after forgiveness of sin by the blood of Christ" and to such is the gospel invitation given. Andrew Fuller believed that "thirst" here does not mean "holy desire after spiritual blessings" but rather a "natural desire of happiness" which God places in every bosom.
- Matthew 11:25–28 "...Come unto me, all ye that labour and are heavy laden..." John Gill reasoned from this scripture that the persons invited here are "not all the individuals of mankind," but those who are "burdened with the guilt of sin upon their consciences." John Calvin commented here that "it would be in vain" for Christ to invite those who are "devoted to the world" or those who are "intoxicated with their own righteousness." On this verse, he also stated that Christ is "ready to reveal the Father to all" though the greater part is careless of coming to him.
- Mark 2:15–17 "...I came not to call the righteous, but sinners to repentance." John Gill noted here that Christ "attended the one, and not the other." He also stated that this scripture refers to the "usefulness of Christ to one sort, and not another."
- Luke 4:18 "...he hath anointed me to preach the gospel to the poor; he hath sent me to heal the brokenhearted..."
- Revelation 22:17 "...let him that is athirst come. And whosoever will, let him take the water of life freely."

=== Biblical references used against duty-faith ===
- Romans 4:13 "...the promise, that he should be the heir of the world, was not to Abraham, or to his seed, through the law, but through the righteousness of faith." The Baptist pastor Job Hupton concluded from this scripture that "the eternal inheritance" is not by "the law and its duty," but through "the gospel and its promises."
- Romans 4:16 "...it is of faith, that it might be by grace; to the end the promise might be sure..." William Button made the argument here that "if faith is a duty (and so a work)" the apostle Paul should have rather said "It is of faith that it might be by works." He concluded that there is a "beauty" here in the apostles words because faith is rather a "blessing of the covenant of grace" and a "fruit of electing grace."
- Galatians 3:11–12 "...the law is not of faith..." The Baptist minister William Wales Horne asserted from this scripture that because faith is a grace of the Spirit, it is therefore not a duty of the law. He also reasoned that faith is not "a duty which God requires of his people," but rather "a grace which he gives them."
- Ephesians 2:8–9 "...by grace are ye saved through faith; and that not of yourselves..." The English Baptist John Foreman made an argument here that their faith was not a "duty produced of themselves" or of a "divine requirement," for God determined that his gift should "not be of works, and so not of duty."
- 2 Timothy 1:9 "...not according to our works, but according to his own purpose and grace..." John Foreman reasoned from this scripture that grace is "sovereign and particular only" and that here is the reason why all men are not called and saved by God's purpose and grace given before the world began. In light of this, he contended against the view that persons are "damned for not coming" to Christ for salvation.

== See also ==
- Amyraldism – Christian doctrine
- Calvinism – Protestant denominational family
- Comparative theology – Discipline within theology
- Free offer of the gospel
- John Gill – English theologian and minister (1697–1771)
- Ordo salutis – Theological concepts in Christianity
- Predestination – Doctrine in Christian theology
- Protestant Reformed Churches in America – Protestant denomination
- Reformed Baptists – Calvinist strand of the Baptist denomination
