= John Angell James =

English Nonconformist clergyman and writer (1785–1859)

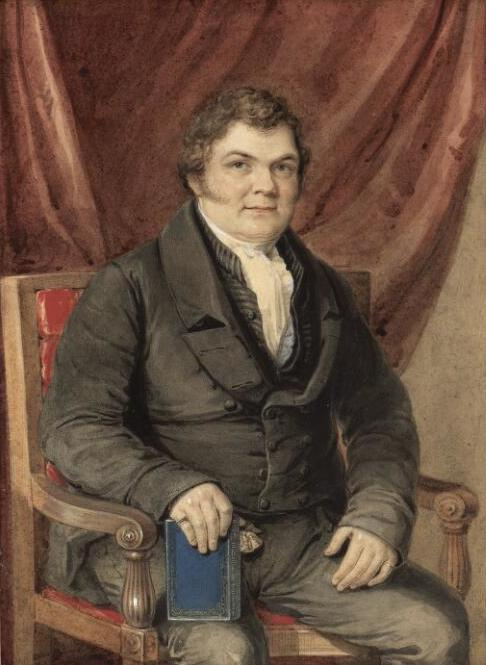
- Portrait of John Angell James c.1830
- Born: 6 June 1785; Blandford Forum
- Died: 1 October 1859 (aged 74); Birmingham, England
- Resting place: Key Hill Cemetery, Birmingham, England
- Education: Gosport Academy
- Occupations: Minister, chaplain
- Known for: Writing
- Successor: Robert William Dale

John Angell James (6 June 1785 – 1 October 1859), was an English Nonconformist clergyman and writer. James was a typical Congregational preacher of the early 19th century, massive and elaborate rather than original. His doctrine was a moderate form of Calvinism, as had been that of Edward Williams, one of his predecessors.

== Early life ==
He was born at Blandford Forum, the eldest son of the linen draper Joseph James (died 1812) and his wife Sarah; his younger brother Thomas James (1789–1873) was also a minister, and became secretary of the Colonial Missionary Society in 1850.

James was educated at a school in Blandford, and then boarding schools. One of those, run at Wareham by the presbyterian minister Robert Kell (1761–1842), an Arian from Daventry Academy who was later at Birmingham, is regarded by Binfield as superior. In later life, James felt his education fell short of his needs as a pastor.

== Poole ==
James took an apprenticeship to a linen-draper in Poole, Dorset, named Bailey. Bailey attended the Poole Independent meeting house. It had Edward Ashburner (died 1804) as minister, once at the Mile End Academy; he was replaced in 1801 by Thomas Durant, from Hoxton College. Visiting preachers included John Sibree from Frome, and Richard Keynes.

At Poole, James was influenced by James Bennett to consider training as a minister. He was also influenced by reading Social Religion Exemplify'd by Mathias Maurice.

Bailey failed in business. In 1802, bought out of his apprenticeship by his father, James went to David Bogue's dissenting academy at Gosport, Hampshire. His fellow student at the academy, Robert Morrison, gave him a lifelong interest in missionary work in China.

== Minister ==
James preached first at Ryde on the Isle of Wight. In 1804, he preached to the congregation of Carrs Lane Independent chapel, in Birmingham. They invited him to exercise his ministry; he settled there in 1805, and was ordained in May 1806. He remained at the chapel for the rest of his life, having Robert William Dale as co-pastor from 1854.

=== Preacher ===
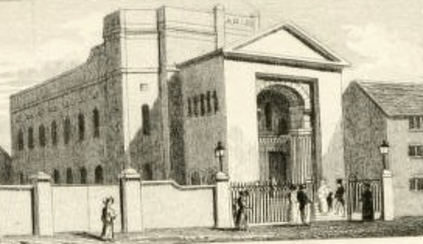
Carrs Lane Independent chapel, 1830 engraving

During the early years in Birmingham, James's congregation was comparatively small. His predecessor Jehoiada Brewer had moved in 1802, to Livery Street, and much of the congregation had gone with him.

The chapel was closed for a time at the end of 1812 for some works on a gallery to be carried out. James was able to use the Old Meeting House, and gained publicity; he and others thanked Robert Kell in 1813.

From about 1814, James began to attract large crowds. A new chapel was built for him, completed in 1820, with room for 2000. The Baptist minister Cornelius Slim wrote "as a preacher he set his face dead against heartless formalism on the one hand, and Puseyite Romanizing on the other."

In his autobiography Charles Haddon Spurgeon wrote:

In an early part of my ministry, while but a lad, I was seized with an intense desire to hear Mr. John Angell James; and, though my finances were somewhat meagre, I performed a pilgrimage to Birmingham solely with that object in view. I heard him deliver a week-evening lecture, in his large vestry, on that precious text, "Ye are complete in Him." The savour of that very sweet discourse abides with me to this day, and I shall never read the passage without associating therewith the quiet but earnest utterances of that eminent man of God.

=== Interests and views ===
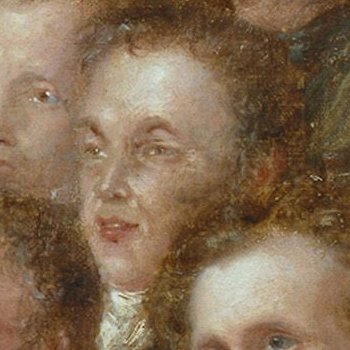
John Angell James portrayed in The Anti-Slavery Society Convention, 1840, by Benjamin Robert Haydon

A contemporary of William Wilberforce and Charles Simeon, John Angell James was one of the founders in 1831 of the Congregational Union of England and Wales. He wrote in 1828 to the American minister William Patton, discounting the significance of revival in the British context. Bebbington points out that this view ignores Methodism. He opposed, unlike Robert William Dale, Edward Miall's agitation against the established status of the Church of England.

James was an abolitionist, and is portrayed in the huge canvas depicting Thomas Clarkson's opening address at the world's first Anti-Slavery Convention in 1840, in the National Portrait Gallery, London. His prominence in the Evangelical Alliance, formed 1846, led to his becoming a target that year, along with Ralph Wardlaw of the Scottish Free Church, for a polemical pamphlet by Henry Clarke Wright, a follower of the radical abolitionist William Lloyd Garrison. Lewis Tappan discussed Wright's campaigning in a letter to John Scoble, saying "Messrs Garrison, Thompson & Wright utter much truth, to be sure, but of what consequence is it when the spirit they manifest is so bad."

James was involved in missionary endeavours, and was a supporter of the London Missionary Society. His name frequently appears in the Evangelical Magazine and Missionary Chronicle. In 1817 it was James who handed Bibles to John Williams (of Erromanga) and Robert Moffat, in the commissioning service which sent them off to their fields of labour. He was the main instigator of an effort to send a million New Testaments to China. In the event they raised enough money for two million copies.

Municipal interests appealed strongly to James, and he was for many years chairman of Spring Hill College, Birmingham.

== Death ==
In August 1859, at the ceremony for the laying of the foundation stone of The Metropolitan Tabernacle, Charles Spurgeon said, "Especially must I mention the name of that honoured father of all the Dissenting churches, the Rev. John Angell James, of Birmingham. There is no name I think just now that ought to be more venerated than his."

John Angell James died less than two months later, at his home in Birmingham, on 1 October 1859. By special permission of the Home Secretary he was permitted to be interred in a vault beneath his pulpit in Carr's Lane Chapel, as had long been his wish. On 15 June 1970, when Carrs Lane Church was being rebuilt, the coffins of John Angell James and his second wife were disinterred and reburied at Witton Cemetery, Birmingham, in an unmarked common grave (Grave No. 147, Section 15).

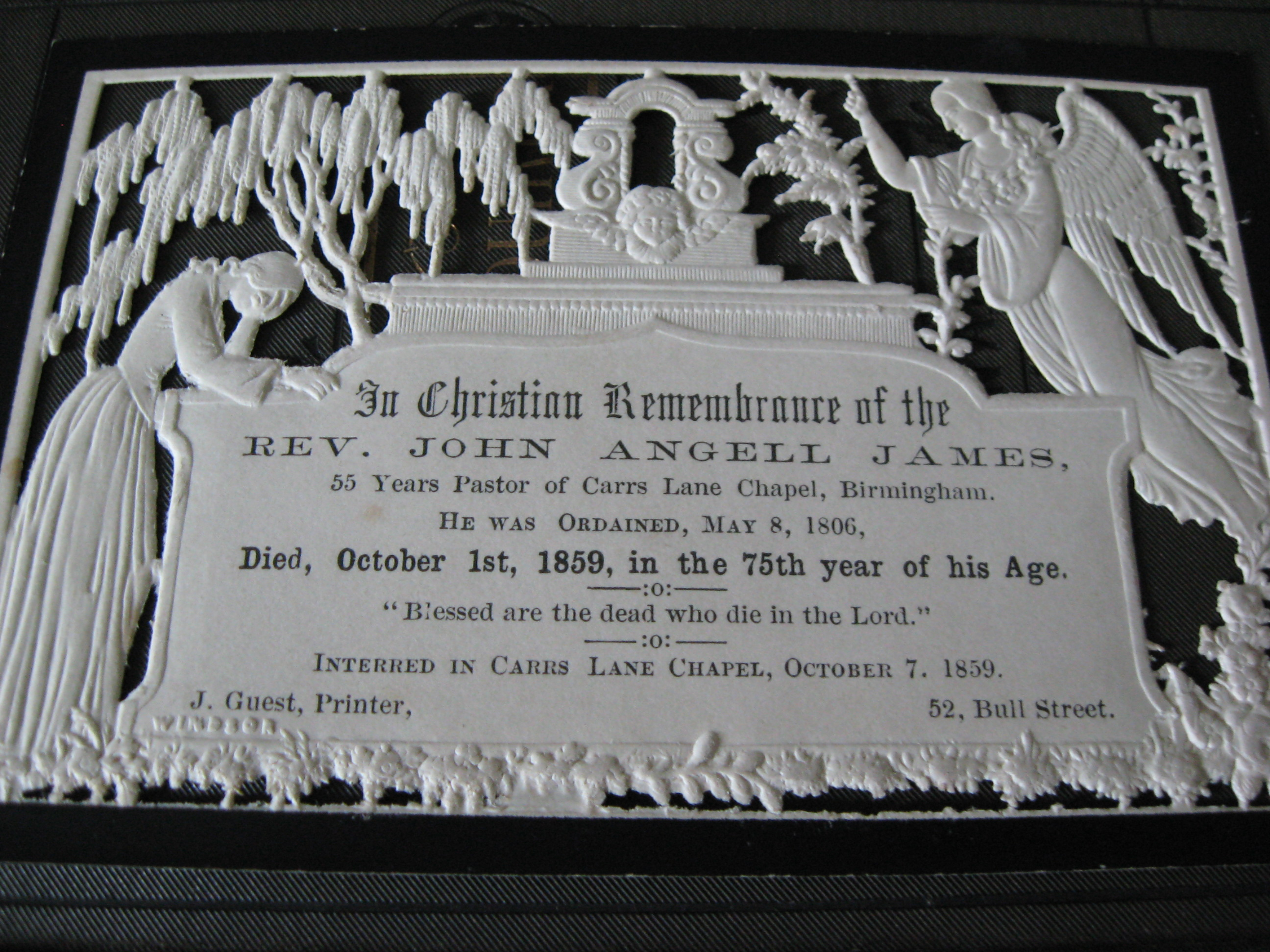
'In Memoriam' Card for John Angell James

== Works ==
Letters from John Angell James

- The Sunday School Teachers' Guide, 1816
- Christian Fellowship, or the Church Members' Guide, 1822
- The Christian Father's Present to his Children, 1824
- Christian Charity Explained, 1828
- The Family Monitor, or a Help to Domestic Happiness, 1828
- The Anxious Inquirer after Salvation Directed and Encouraged, 1834 (Reprinted by Quinta Press, 2003)
- The Christian Professor, 1837
- The Young Man from Home, 1838
- Pastoral Addresses, first series, 1840
- Pastoral Addresses, second series, 1841
- The Widow Directed to the Widow's God, 1841
- Pastoral Addresses, third series, 1842
- An Earnest Ministry the Want of the Times, 1847 (reprinted by Banner of Truth Trust, 1993)
- The Church in Earnest, 1848
- The Young Man's Friend and Guide through Life to Immortality, 1851
- Female Piety, or the Young Woman's Guide through Life to Immortality, 1852
- The Course of Faith, or the Practical Believer Delineated, 1852
- Christian Progress, 1853
- Christian Hope, 1858
- The Works of John Angell James (17 volumes), Hamilton Adams, 1860–64

James's religious writings, the best known of which are The Anxious Inquirer and An Earnest Ministry, acquired a wide circulation. The Anxious Inquirer sold over 500,000 copies in his lifetime and was translated into more than a dozen languages. This was the book which D. Martyn Lloyd-Jones gave to his wife, Bethan, when she was seeking the Lord. The book was also of great help to Charles Haddon Spurgeon. James published numerous books on practical subjects of the Christian life, including: The Anxious Inquirer, Pastoral Addresses, an Earnest Ministry, A Help to Domestic Happiness, Female Piety, The Christian Father's Present to His Children, The Young Man's Friend and Guide, and The Widow Directed to the Widow's God. Many of these are still in print.

== Family ==
James married, firstly, to Frances Charlotte Smith (born 1783), on 7 July 1806. Frances, a physician's daughter of independent fortune, resided in Hagley Road, Birmingham, where their family would live. They had four children:

- Stillborn (1807)
- Thomas Smith James (1809–1874): see below
- Daughter (1810–1811)
- Sarah Ann James (1814–1882)

Frances died 27 January 1819. Her widower remarried, to Anna Maria Neale on 19 February 1822. Anna was the widow of Benjamin Neale (whom she had married in 1812). She had no children. Benjamin Neale (died 1816) was the son of James Neale (died 1814) of St Paul's Churchyard, London, of the porcelain merchants Neale & Bailey; and Anna was wealthy.

John Angell James's brother, Thomas (1789–1873), also became a pastor, based in London. His brother James was a deacon at Carrs Lane Chapel. His sister Harriet married Rev. Richard Keynes who became pastor of the Congregational church in Salisbury Street, Blandford Forum, where John Angell James had attended as a child. His sister Hannah married Rev. John Bowden Simper.

=== Thomas Smith James ===
Thomas Smith James (1809–1874) was a solicitor in Birmingham. He edited his father's works (Published in 17 volumes, 1860–64, by Hamilton Adams) in which he also defended his father's view of justification, against criticisms made by his co-pastor Richard William Dale, in The Life and Letters of John Angell James (1861).

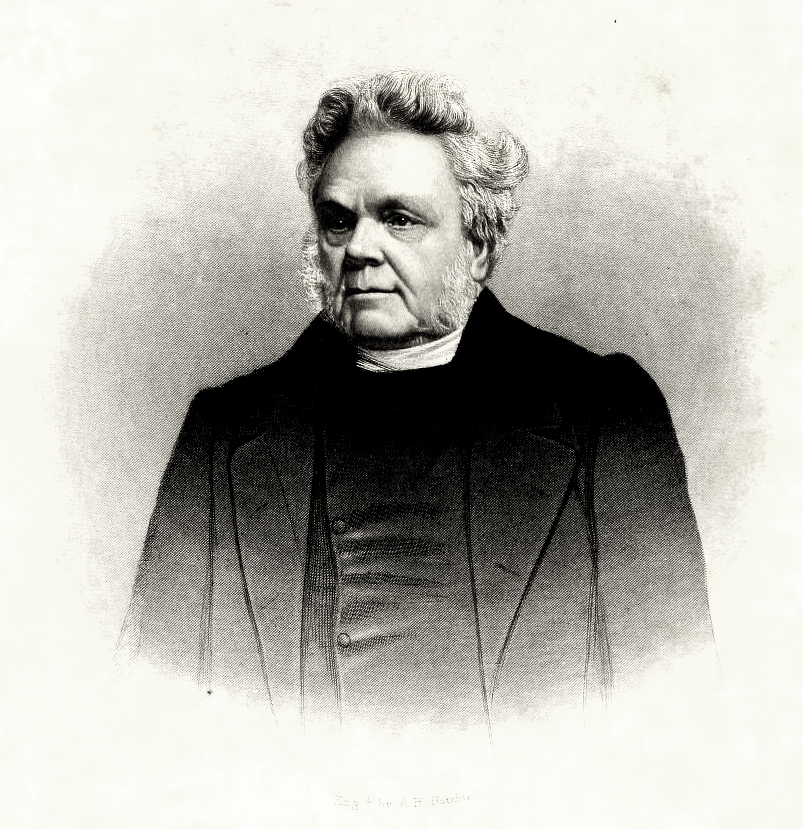
John Angell James, portrait from The Life and Letters of John Angell James

Thomas Smith James also published The History of the Litigation and Legislation respecting Presbyterian Chapels and Charities in England and Ireland 1867. Part of this work had been issued earlier as Lists and Classifications of Presbyterian and Independent Ministers, 1717–31, 1866; an "Addendum" [1868] dealt with the criticisms of John Gordon. The work was inaccurate; it did contain "Dr. Evans's List" (1715–1729). His first wife died within weeks of marriage. He married a second time and had two daughters. He died on 3 February 1874.
