= Jehoiada Brewer =

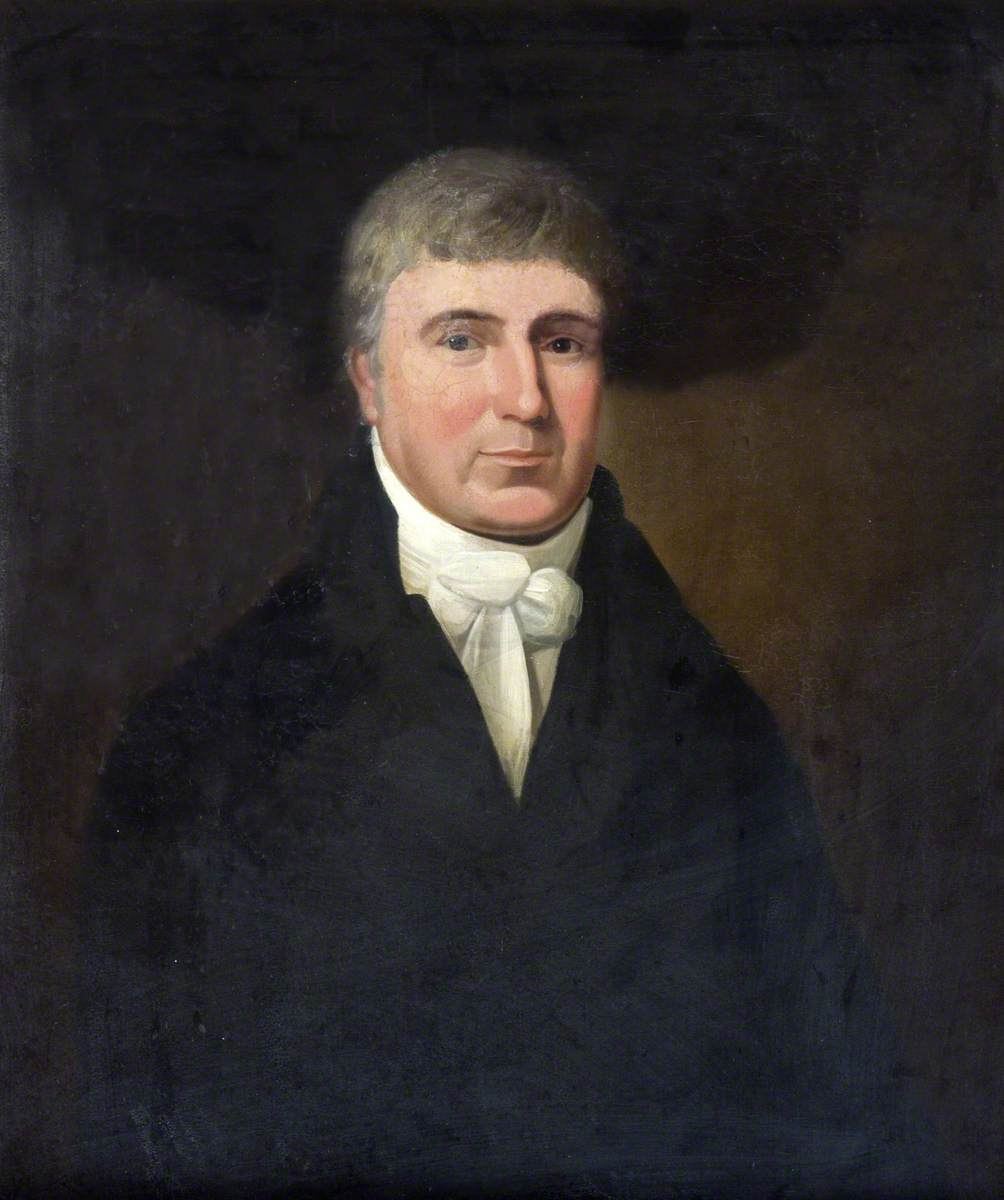
Jehoida Brewer

Jehoiada Brewer (1752?–1817) was a Welsh dissenting minister. Refused ordination to the Church of England, he was known as a preacher, and hymn writer.

== Life ==
Brewer was born at Newport in Monmouthshire about 1752. He originally planned to be a businessman.

Influenced by a minister of the Countess of Huntingdon's Connexion, he took to preaching in the villages around Bath, and afterwards preached with popularity throughout Monmouthshire. Intending to enter the national church, he applied for ordination, but was refused by the bishop. Brewer persisted in preaching, whether ordained or not, and for some years he settled at Rodborough in Gloucestershire. He later attracted a large congregation at Sheffield, where he spent thirteen years, and ultimately settled at Birmingham. He preached at the Carrs Lane Church until 1802. He then moved to Livery Street, where his ministry was numerously attended until his death. The Carrs Lane work was taken on by John Angell James.

Brewer died 24 August 1817. A spacious chapel was being built for him at the time he died, and he was buried in the grounds adjoining it. Brewer had laid the foundation stone in 1816.

A portrait of Brewer was inserted in the Christian's Magazine, 1791. A different portrait of him appeared in the Evangelical Magazine in 1799.

== Works ==
A specimen of Brewer's preaching is printed as part of the service at the ordination of Jonathan Evans (died 1809) at Foleshill in 1797, and Brewer's oration at the burial of Samuel Pearce at Birmingham was printed with the sermon of John Ryland on the same occasion in 1799. Brewer is now remembered only by a single hymn, printed with the signature of "Sylvestris" in the Gospel Magazine, 1776. "Hail, Sovereign Love" is quite well known.

Two or three of Brewer's hymns were probably included in the hymnbook of John Stevens (1776–1847).
