= Elephantiasis =

Enlargement and hardening of body parts due to swelling

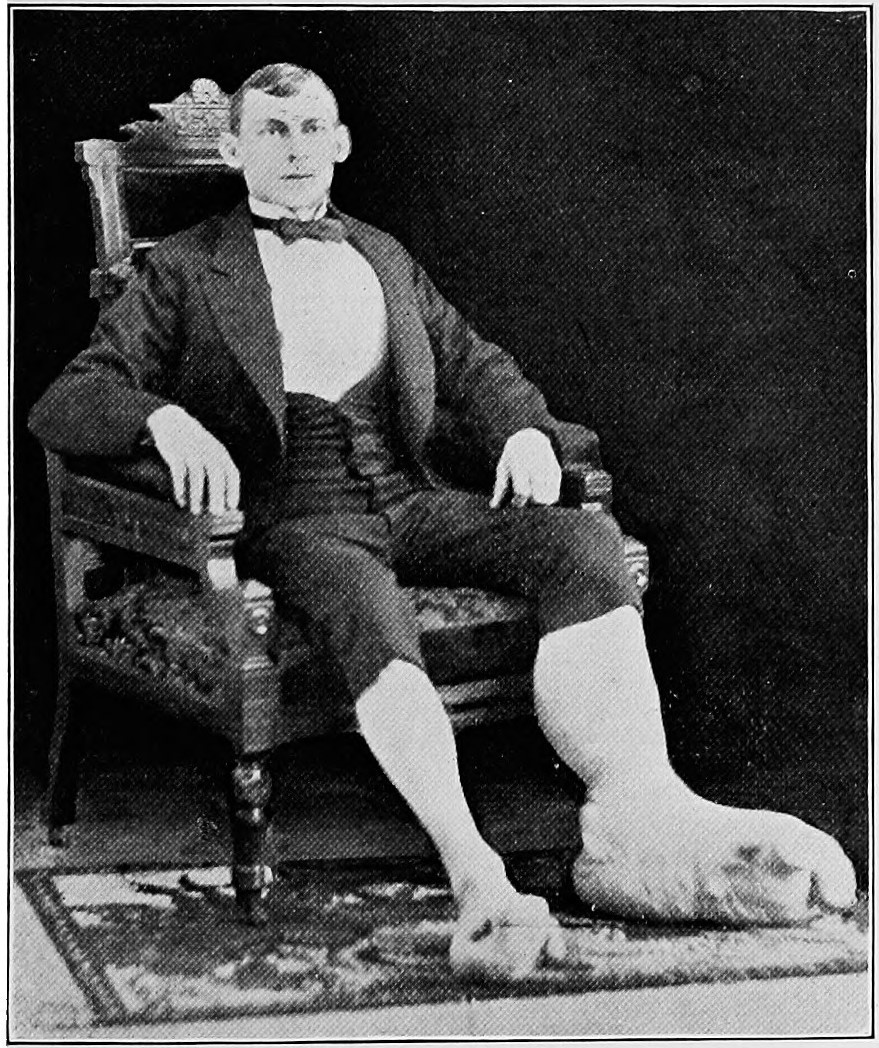
- Elephantiasis of the legs due to filariasis
- Specialty: Infectious disease, general surgery
- Symptoms: Swelling of the skin

Elephantiasis, often incorrectly called elephantitis, is the enlargement and hardening of limbs or body parts due to tissue swelling (edema). It is characterised by edema, hypertrophy, and fibrosis of skin and subcutaneous tissues, due to obstruction of lymphatic vessels (lymphedema). It may affect the genitalia. The term elephantiasis is often used in reference to symptoms caused by parasitic worm infections, but may refer to a variety of diseases that swell parts of the subject's body to exceptionally massive proportions.

== Cause ==
Some conditions that present with elephantiasis include the following:

- Elephantiasis nostras, due to longstanding chronic lymphangitis.
- Elephantiasis tropica (known as lymphatic filariasis), caused by a number of parasitic nematode worms, particularly Wuchereria bancrofti. More than 120 million people, mostly in Africa and Southeast Asia, are affected.
- Nonfilarial elephantiasis (or podoconiosis), an immune disease affecting the lymph vessels
- Leishmaniasis
- Elephantiasis, Grade 3 lymphedema, which may occur in people with breast cancer
- Genital elephantiasis, result of lymphogranuloma venereum
- Proteus syndrome, a genetic disorder best known as the condition possibly experienced by Joseph Merrick, the so-called Elephant Man

Other causes may include:

- Repeated streptococcal infection
- Lymphadenectomy
- Hereditary birth defects
- Pretibial myxedema

Other diseases, such as the rare Klippel–Trénaunay syndrome, can initially be misdiagnosed as elephantiasis.

Elephantiasis may have been the skin condition suffered by Biblical character Job.
