= Carrs Lane Church, Birmingham =

Carrs Lane Church
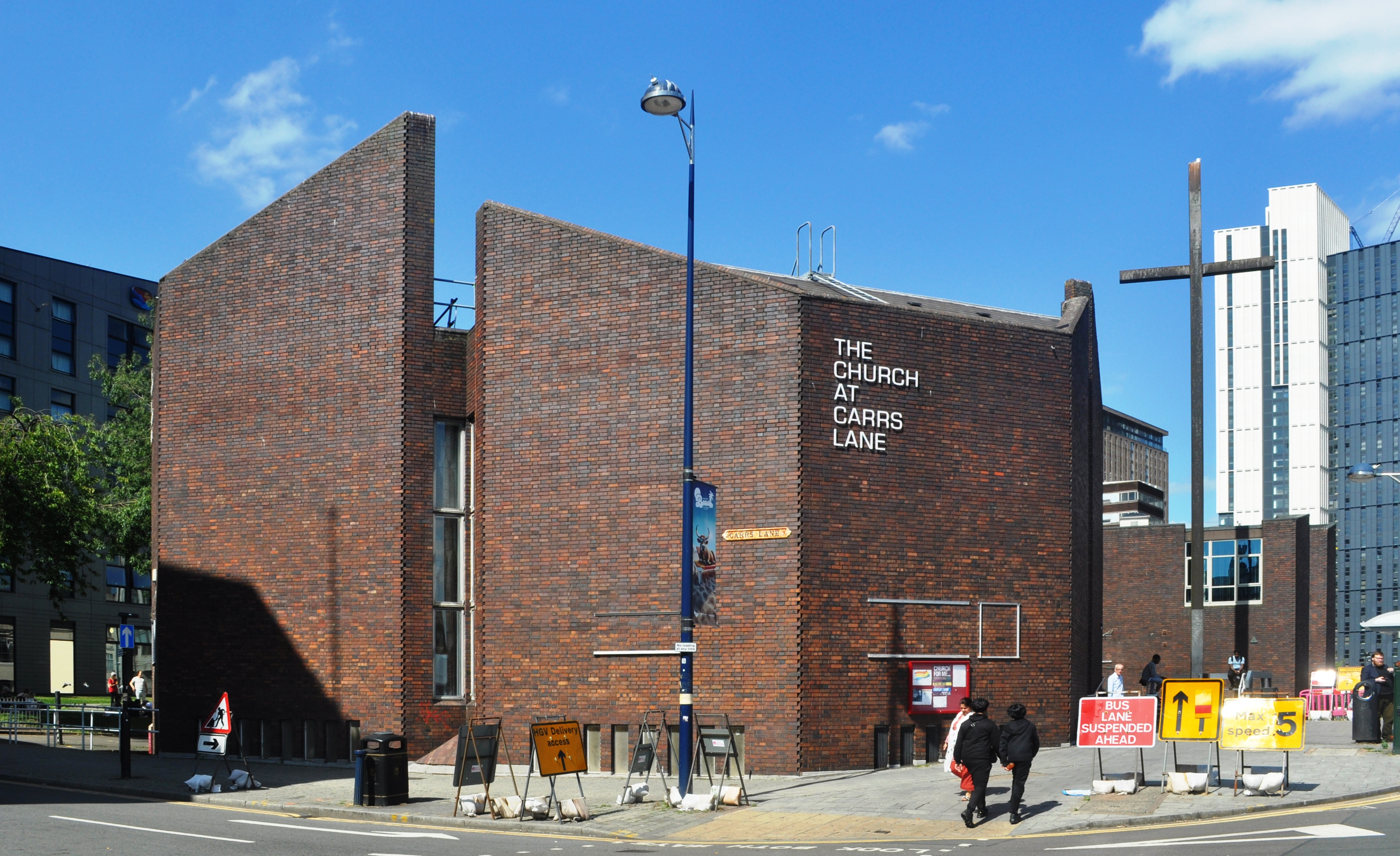
- The church in August 2024
- Carrs Lane Church
- 52°28′46.62″N 1°53′35.02″W
- OS grid reference: SP 07359 86858
- Location: Birmingham
- Country: England
- Denomination: United Reformed and Methodist
- Previous denomination: Congregational

Architecture
- Architect(s): Denys Hinton and Partners
- Groundbreaking: 1968
- Completed: 1971

Carrs Lane Church, also known as The Church at Carrs Lane, is a church in Birmingham that is most known for having the largest free-standing cross in the UK.

== History ==
The church was founded as an independent chapel in 1748 and then enlarged in 1812 at a cost of £2,000 to seat 600 people, not least due to the popularity of the preaching of John Angell James. A further enlargement was undertaken in 1820 to designs by the architect Thomas Stedman Whitwell, which was then re-fronted by Yeoville Thomason in 1876. The church became part of the Congregational Union in 1832.

The current building was begun in 1968 by Denys Hinton and Partners and completed in 1971. It became part of the United Reformed Church when the Presbyterian and Congregational churches merged in 1972. The church bears a blue plaque erected by Birmingham Civic Society in 1995 to commemorate Dr R. W. Dale, minister at Carrs Lane from 1854 until his death, and prominent preacher of the "Civic Gospel".

Since the closure of the Methodist Central Hall, Birmingham, the building has been shared with the Methodist Congregation, as a local ecumenical partnership under the name "The Church at Carrs Lane".

== Organ ==
The church has a pipe organ by Hill Norman and Beard dating from 1970. A specification of the organ can be found on the National Pipe Organ Register.

=== Organists ===
- Samuel Stanley (composer) 1792 - 1803 (afterwards organist at Ebenezer Church until 1822)
- Adam Wright 1845 - 1876
- William C. Stockley 1876 - 1889
- Walter Humphreys 1889 - 1895 (formerly organist of Wesley Chapel, West Bromwich)
- C.H. Pett 1895 - 1901
- Maurice Davies 1901 - ????
- R.A. Ernest Payne ???? - 1915
- Charles William Perkins 1915 - 1920
- Graham Godfrey 1920 - 1930
- Cyril Stanley Christopher 1930 - 1967
