= Hariharan Srinivasan =

Indian surgeon (1929–2015)

Dr. Hariharan Srinivasan
- Born: 7 September 1929; Vellore, Tamil Nadu
- Died: 21 December 2015 (aged 86)
- Other name: Charvakan
- Occupations: orthopedic surgeon, writer

Dr. Hariharan Srinivasan (7 September 1929 – 21 December 2015) was an Indian orthopedic surgeon who worked primarily with leprosy. He wrote under the pen name Charvakan in Tamil. He retired in 2008.

== Personal life ==
Dr. Srinivasan spent most of his working life in correcting the deformed hands and feet of leprosy-affected persons. During his active period, he was highly regarded for his academic and research work in the management and prevention of deformities and disabilities in persons with insensitive and paralysed hands and feet in general and the leprosy-affected in particular. He retired from active work in 2008.

Dr.Srinivasan attended elementary and middle school at Vellore, and high school in the District Board High School in Arni. He studied at Madras Christian College in Tambaram, later joining the Madras Medical College and receiving his MBBS degree in 1952. He got his FRCS (Edinburgh) in 1957 and FRCS (England) in 1958. He was in UK from 1954 to 1958 and worked in Hospitals in Birmingham, North Wales and London in different capacities such as House Surgeon, Senior House Surgeon, Registrar and Locum Consultant.

Dr.Srinivasan was interested in Tamil literature from an early age. His grandfather Krishna Iyer and uncle, Krishna Sivarman were Tamil scholars. Srinivasan himself is a writer in Tamil Stories and one of which was selected as "best short story of the year" by a Tamil Literary Forum in 1971. His short stories are collected and published as Charvakan kathaigal.

== Career ==
Srinivasan worked in Vellore in 1953, and travelled to England in 1954. From 1954 to 1958 he worked in Hospitals in Birmingham, North Wales and London. He was later married in London in 1957. In 1959, he returned to India and joined Kasturba Medical College, Mangalore, and worked in Government Wenlock Hospital, Mangalore, Karnataka. His work with leprosy began there. In 1962, he became a full-time orthopaedic surgeon in Central Leprosy Teaching and Research Institute(CLTRI) in Chengalpattu, formerly Chingleput. After retiring from the Central Leprosy Teaching and Research Institute, He worked as a research consultant at the Portland Hand Surgery & Rehabilitation Centre in Portland, Oregon United States from 1984 to 1986, focusing on carpal tunnel syndrome. He became a member of the WHO Expert Advisory Panel for leprosy in 1985

He joined Central JALMA Institute for Leprosy in Agra, India from 1987 to 1990. During that time, he conducted a number of surgical workshops sponsored by the World Health Organization for medical colleges in India, training approximately 100 surgeons. Srinivasan became editor of the Indian Journal of Leprosy in 1990 to 2001, and joined a panel for leprosy in the World Health Organization in 1985. He has published approximately 90 papers in medical journals, authored three books, and contributed chapters in ten textbooks on Leprosy, dermatology and surgery.

== Awards and honours ==
Dr.Srinivasan has received various awards, including the

- Padma Shri in 1984
- "JALMA Trust Fund Oration Award" in 1979 from the Indian council of medical research
- "International Gandhi Award" in 2004.
- He was conferred a "Doctor of Science (Honoris Causa)" by the Medical University of Tamil Nadu in 2004.
- The International Federation of Societies for Surgery of the Hand awarded him "Pioneer of Hand Surgery" in 2007.
