= Stanley George Browne =

British medical missionary and leprologist

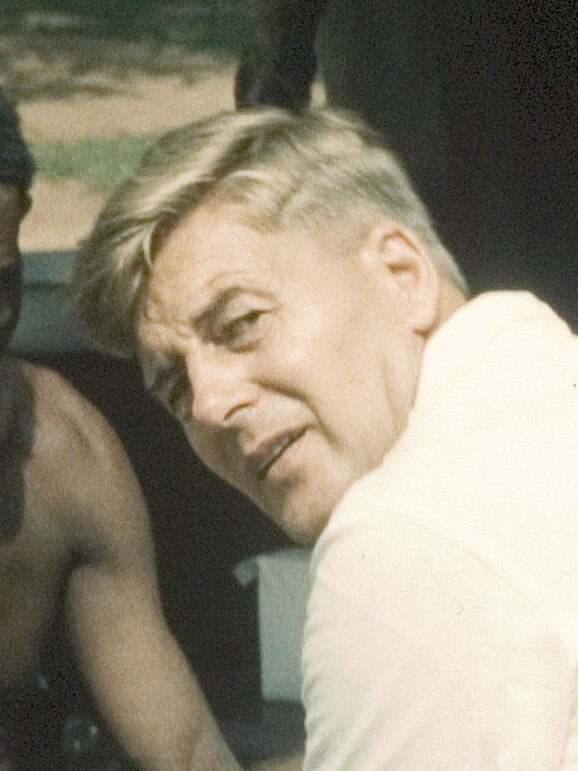
- Stanley Browne. Credit: Wellcome Collection
- Born: 8 December 1907; New Cross, London, England
- Died: 20 January 1986 (aged 78)
- Occupation: Surgeon
- Known for: Medical research and missionary

Stanley George Browne CMG OBE FRCS FRCP (8 December 1907 – 20 January 1986), also called "Bonganga" by the community members with whom he worked, was a British medical missionary and leprologist known for his work and his many research achievements throughout the 20th century in the Belgian Congo, Nigeria, and India including his early use of Dapsone. He received numerous awards throughout his academic and professional career. He is also known as an academic for his early publications surrounding his findings of leprosy of which he published about 150 articles and five books.

== Early life and education ==
Browne was born on 8 December 1907 in New Cross London. His father was the local post office clerk and Baptist church secretary. Browne attended Brockley Central School where he excelled and won many awards highlighting his academic achievements; however, he left at age 15 in order earn his living working as clerk at the Deptford Town Hall. He took evening classes in order to pass matriculation. He then attended King's College London with scholarships for both his studies of medicine as well as theology. As a student at King's College, he received awards for his academic achievements such as the Barry, Leathes and Warneford prizes, the Warneford Gold Metal, the Jeff Medal, and later: distinctions in surgery, forensic medicine, and hygiene. He received the Murchison Scholarship for most outstanding medical graduate. After graduating with high medical honors, he went to Antwerp for another year of study to obtain a diploma in tropical medicine. During this time, he also became fluent in French. He became a member of the Royal College of Physicians in 1934 and the Royal College of Surgeons of England in 1935.

== Personal life ==
Browne met his wife Marion (Mali) Williamson on holiday in England in 1939. She was born in China as the daughter of two Baptist missionaries and her father was the General Foreign Secretary of the Baptist Mission House. She graduated from Oxford University and worked as teacher. They became engaged after their third meeting. The onset of World War II required Browne to return to the Congo shortly after the two had met. Browne was instructed to continue to maintain the health of the Congolese, who were involved in the mining of many metals, especially Uranium, that were contributing to the Allies' war effort. Despite their geographical separation, Browne and Williamson continued their relations until she was able to join him permanently in the Congo late in 1940. They married at Yakusu on 15 November 1940. Their three sons, Derek, Alastair and Christopher, were all born at Yakusu. Derek, their eldest son, was born in 1942, followed by Alastair in 1946 and Christopher in 1947. Although born in the Congo, from the age of three Derek lived in Britain and was raised by relatives. He attended boarding school at Eltham College. Alastair and Christopher were raised at Yakusu until old enough to attend boarding school at Eltham.

Browne also had a sister, Winifred, who worked as a nurse alongside him at Yakusu.

== Missionary Journey ==
Browne accredits his interest in pursuing a medical career to the kindness and attention his mother received from doctors near the end of her life. His aspirations to become a missionary began at a young age when he heard Henry Holman Bentley, the first white child born in the Congo, speak at a London Sunday School.

Responding to "an urgent need for new recruits", Browne, "made up his mind to offer his services as a doctor to the Baptist Missionary Society". After he graduated medical school, he spent an additional year studying for a tropical medicine diploma in Belgium. Following his year in Belgium, Browne began his journey to the medical mission at Yakusu mission station in the Belgian Congo. After sailing to Matadi, he rode the then recently built Congo-Ocean Railway 228 miles to Leopoldville. Upon arrival in Leopoldville, he received further tropical medicine training and met his predecessor, Dr. Clement Chesterman and fellow missionary Dr. Raymond Holmes. After taking time to adjust to the equatorial climate and further his studies, Browne travelled by air to the mission station in Yakusu. A strong storm while in flight caused for a near plane crash, but Brown and his counterparts were ultimately able to land safely. The final part of the journey to Yakusu hospital was made by canoe. Browne arrived in what would become his new home ready to begin his experiences as a medical missionary in April 1936.

== Missionary work ==
From 1936 to 1958, Browne dedicated himself to the mission hospital at Yakusu, Belgian Congo. At Yakusu, he performed a wide range of roles from treating disease outbreaks and researching diseases to performing operations to midwifery. Patients with a wide variety of ailments arrived from surrounding areas daily to seek care. He frequently handled outbreaks of smallpox, polio, tuberculosis, malaria, yaws and typhoid and made major breakthroughs in the treatment of leprosy and Onchocerciasis. Browne, who would later concentrate his studies on leprosy, was one of the first doctors to use Dapsone in the treatment of leprosy. He made a major epidemiological breakthrough related to Onchocerciasis, commonly known as river blindness, when he discovered it was caused by a black fly that bred on crabs. After having the crabs caught and exterminated and the streams cleaned, 98% of the black fly population had disappeared. Despite being based in Yakusu, following Chesterman's network of community health centers, Browne embarked on frequent expeditions to surrounding dispensaries and mission stations, traveling by car, motor boat, canoe or on foot. The doctors of Yakusu were often called to surrounding areas to provide medical care to acutely ill or injured patients.

Browne and his coworkers created a maternity wing and prenatal clinic as part of Yakusu with the goal of reducing high infant mortality rates. Another notable accomplishment was the leprosarium he created and had constructed across the River Congo at Yalisombo. At the leprosarium, he developed a programme of community care using over 50 health centers throughout the area he oversaw. This model was adopted in Africa for the control of endemic disease. His work at Yalisombo attracted the attention of a prominent leprologist, Dr. Robert Cochrane, who encouraged him focus his studies on leprosy. During his time at Yakusu, he served as principal of the School of Medical Auxiliaries, developing a model rural health service.

In 1958, Browne resigned from the Baptist Missionary Society. He was recruited by the government of the Eastern Region of Nigeria to succeed Dr. Frank Davey as senior leprologist. As a result of his continued contributions to the fight against leprosy, he was known as 'Mr. Leprosy' throughout West Africa. While in Nigeria, he pioneered the use of anti-leprosy drug, clofazimine.

Browne returned to England 1965 and used his vast knowledge and research of leprosy to consult for the World Health Organization, International Federation of Anti-Leprosy Association (ILEP), various Christian Medical associations, Mother Teresa's leprosy hospital in Calcutta, and the International Albert Schweitzer Fellowship.

== Legacy and honours ==
Browne contributed over 500 learned articles to scientific journals over his career. He is most recognised for his contributions to the fields of tropical medicine and leprosy. He served as Secretary of the International Leprosy Association from 1966 to 1984, Director of the Leprosy Study Centre in London 1966 to 1980, President of the Royal Society of Tropical Medicine and Hygiene 1977 to 1979, and President of the Baptist Union of Great Britain 1980 to 1981. In 1978, he became one of the first three Fellows of King's College Hospital medical school. He was appointed an Officer of the Order of the British Empire (OBE) in 1965 and a Companion of the Order of Saint Michael and Saint George (CMG) for his work as a foreign servant in 1975. In addition, he received three major awards from King Baudouin of Belgium, the most notable being Commander of the Order of Leopold. This is the highest honour a civilian can receive in Belgium.

== Bibliography ==
- Duncan, Peter; Duncan, Sylvia (1960). Bonganga. New York: William Morrow and Company.
- Thompson, Phyllis (1986). Mister Leprosy. London: Hodder & Stoughton Religious.
