= Thomas Stedman Whitwell =

Thomas Stedman Whitwell (1784–1840) was an English architect and civil engineer, best known for his collaboration with Robert Owen on an unrealised design for a secular communal utopia at New Harmony, Indiana, USA.

== Biography ==
=== Early life ===
Thomas Stedman Whitwell was born in 1784 in Coventry, England. He moved to London in his early twenties, as evidenced in records of his having exhibited at the Royal Academy. In 1811 he was employed in the Architect's Office at the London Docks.

=== Architectural Work in Coventry and Birmingham (1813-1825) ===
After gaining some experience at the London Docks, Whitwell returned to Coventry where he designed a modest number of built works both there and in Birmingham, few of which survive. His last completed commission in England was for the Brunswick Theatre in Whitechapel, London. Mortalities were suffered after the roof trusses, overloaded with theatre equipment, collapsed days after its opening.

=== Involvement in New Harmony, Indiana USA ===
Perhaps due to interest in his exhibition at Leamington Spa of an unbuilt plan for an ideal community named Southville, Whitwell became involved in the designing of a utopian community at a site then named Harmonie (or New Harmony, Indiana) in Indiana, United States, collaborating with the mill owner and social reformer Robert Owen. Owen had previously provided workers at his cotton mills with a pioneering model company town, New Lanark, Scotland, intended to raise the standard of living and education of his employees. Inspired by stories of utopian self-sufficient communities, such as those of the Shakers, springing up in the United States, Owen proposed to create a town unconstrained by the economic conditions and religious influence that he believed had undermined his social experiment in the United Kingdom.

Owen purchased the land and town of Harmonie in Indiana from George Rapp and the Rappites, a separatist religious community. The Rappites had built a substantial and successful town on the site, but sold it to Owen so that they could relocate to an area with more opportunities for trade.

Owen intended to redesign the town as a self-sufficient secular community, complete with factories, pleasure gardens, a gymnasium and educational facilities. Whitwell devised an ordered quadrangular layout for the proposed town, "thirty-three acres; that of the enclosed quadrangle twenty-two acres, nearly three times as large as Russell Square, London". Communal residences were located on the periphery, acting as a boundary wall, and all facilities were to be placed symmetrically within. Whitwell wrote about his careful consideration of the positioning of the building massing to provide ample light and air to all residents. The engraving of Whitwell's famous perspective of the proposed town was entitled "DESIGN for a Community of 2,000 Persons Founded upon a Principle Commended by Plato, Lord Bacon and Sir Thomas More".

The direct influence of Sir Thomas More's book Utopia (1516) on Whitwell's design is obvious. The layout of long communal dwellings of the New Harmony design recalls More's portrayal of the fictional capital of Utopia, Aircastle, where houses built as long terraces contain back doors opening onto shared gardens, features employed in New Harmony.

While New Harmony was intended to be a secular community, Rapp's religious doctrine appears to have influenced Whitwell's design too. Rapp's emphasis on the spiritual experience of nature had led to the inclusion of a labyrinth with a temple in the middle within Harmonie, and other Rappite towns such as Economy, Pennsylvania. All included this vital feature. Whitwell's design for New Harmony also features multiple paths along which residents could meander, but the temple was replaced by a secular "Conservatory, of about one hundred feet in diameter, for the reception and cultivation of exotics".

Whitwell spent some time in New Harmony around 1825–26. However, he returned to England, disillusioned, when the construction of the new town proved financially unviable.

=== Later life ===
Whitwell's short stay at New Harmony allowed him to publish in the New Harmony Gazette a proposal for a new system of town naming according to latitude and longitude, allowing travellers to immediately understand their location from such place names.

Whitwell spent the last part of his life composing theoretical works. One, entitled On Warming and Ventilating Houses and Buildings By Means of Large Volumes of Attempered Air, was published in 1834, but another, intriguingly titled Architectural Absurdities, is now lost.

=== Legacy ===
Whitwell's reputation as an architect has not withstood the test of time, and his texts have either been lost or had little or no influence, but his design for New Harmony has been revisited as one of the culminations of early 19th-century Utopian experimentation in the United States. The proliferation of new communities with emphasis on either religious or secular collective living reached its high point as Whitwell was producing his design for New Harmony. However, none displayed such a graphic interpretation of their own philosophy as Whitwell's famous perspective did.

One of the key features of Whitwell's design, the botanical garden in the centre with equal views and access from every dwelling, was echoed in Ebenezer Howard’s Garden City values and has been carried out in various permutations around the world. One example is Milleara Estate in Avondale Heights, Victoria, Australia, designed by Walter Burley Griffin.

Much of the influence of Whitwell's New Harmony design can be credited to Owen, who toured both the United States and the United Kingdom promoting the plan, even persuading President John Quincy Adams to keep a model of it in his office for a period of time. Owen continued to exhibit and publish it after Whitwell's death in a brochure, Plan for a Model Community.
