= Gail Davey =

British scientist

Gail Davey OBE is a professor of epidemiology at Brighton and Sussex Medical School, University of Sussex, UK. Her work focuses on Neglected Tropical Diseases, particular podoconiosis.

== Career ==
Davey specialises in neglected tropical diseases, especially ones that involve the skin. After taking an MBBChir degree in medicine, she trained in epidemiology at the London School of Hygiene and Tropical Medicine, gaining Masters and MD degrees. She then worked at the School of Public Health, Addis Ababa University, Ethiopia for almost a decade, developing training programmes in public health to doctoral level Her work was initially about the causes and origin of asthma.

In 2005, her research began to focus on podoconiosis, taking a broad view of the disease to include its causes, management and consequences. The stigma and social exclusion caused by this preventable disease mean it is under-reported and a source of economic as well as personal suffering. Davey has been particularly active in both designing effective treatment methods for podoconiosis and promoting its inclusion in national and international public health priorities. This resulted in its inclusion in the WHO list of Neglected Tropical Diseases and also as a health priority in Ethiopia.

She was the founder and first executive director of the non-governmental organisation Footwork, the International Podoconiosis Initiative, in March 2012.

In 2010, Davey returned to the UK supported by a Wellcome Trust University Award that she held at University of Sussex. She subsequently gained tenure, promotion from Reader to Professor, and was appointed Co-Director of the Brighton and Sussex Centre for Global Health Research at University of Sussex. She was also made President of the Royal Society of Tropical Medicine and Hygiene in 2020.

The first international podoconiosis conference, held in Addis Ababa in 2018, was organised by Davey.

She was awarded an OBE in the 2020 Queen's Birthday Honours for her work on neglected tropical diseases.

== Publications ==
Davey is a member of the large multinational collaborations that have contributed to the Global Burden of Diseases, Injuries, and Risk Factors study since 2015. She is author or co-author of over 80 scientific publications or book chapters. They include:

- Kebede Deribe, Jorge Cano, Mei L. Trueba, Melanie J. Newport and Gail Davey. Global epidemiology of podoconiosis: A systematic review. PLOS Neglected Tropical Diseases 12 (3) Article Number: e0006324
- Fasil Tekola Ayele, Adebowale Adeyemo, Chris Finan, Elena Hailu, Paul Sinnott, Natalia Diaz Burlinson, Abraham Aseffa, Charles N. Rotimi, Melanie J. Newport and Gail Davey, (2012) HLA Class II Locus and Susceptibility to Podoconiosis. New England Journal of Medicine 366 1200-1208
- Fasil Tekola, Susan Bull, Bobbie Farsides, Melanie J. Newport, Adebowale Adeyemo, Charles N. Rotimi and Gail Davey Impact of social stigma on the process of obtaining informed consent for genetic research on podoconiosis: a qualitative study. BMC Medical Ethics 10 Article number 13
- Gail Davey, Fasil Tekola, and Melanie J. Newport, (2007) Podoconiosis: non-infectious geochemical elephantiasis. Transactions of the Royal Society of Tropical Medicine and Hygiene 101 (12) 1175-1180
- Fasil Tekola, Damen H Mariam and Gail Davey (2006) Economic costs of endemic non-filarial elephantiasis in Wolaita Zone, Ethiopia. Tropical Medicine and International Health 11 (7) 1136-1144
