= Podoconiosis =

Human disease

- Other names: Nonfilarial elephantiasis
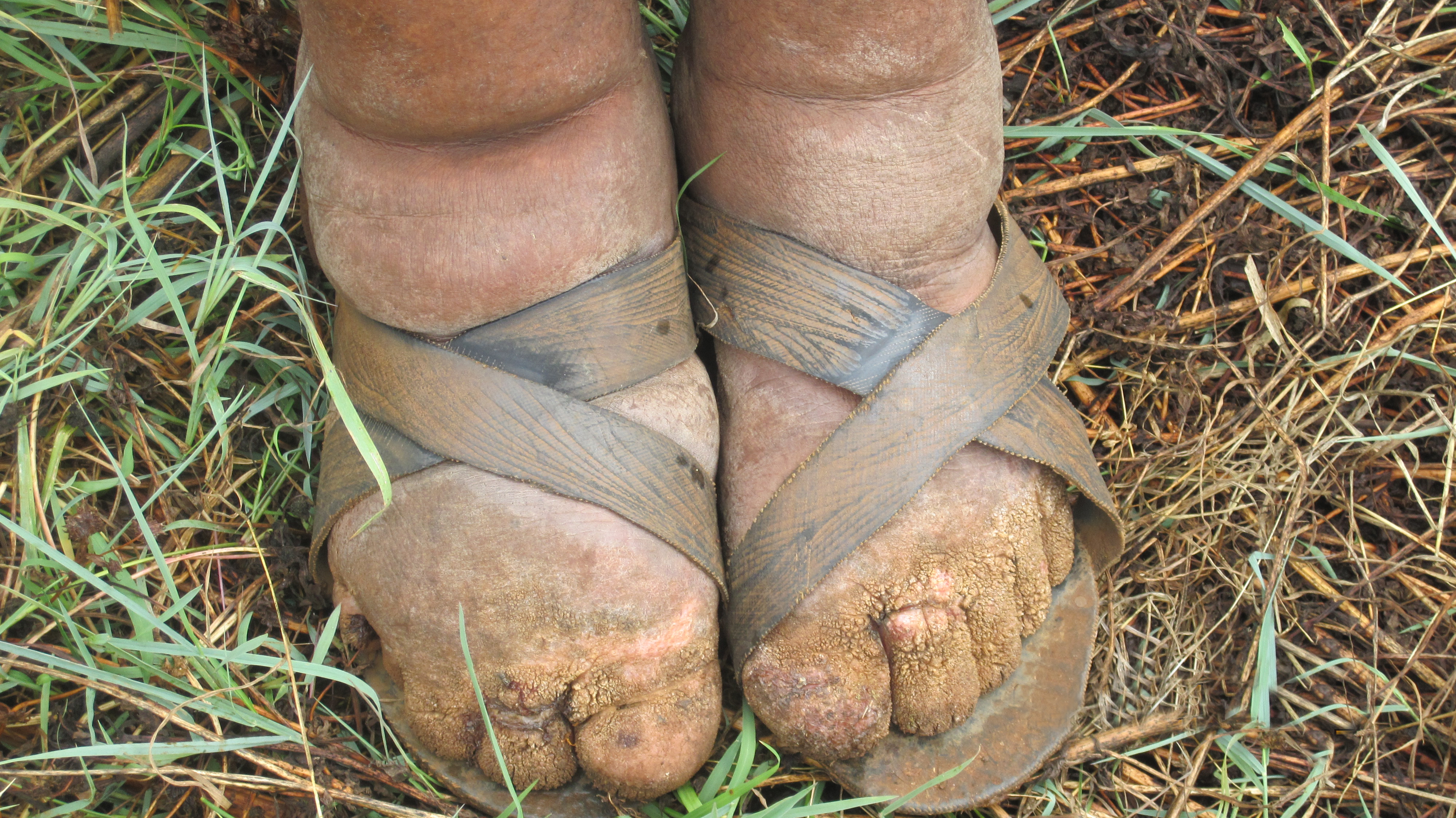
- Bilateral lower extremity swelling and "mossy" hyperkeratotic papillomata characteristic of podoconiosis
- Specialty: Toxicology

Podoconiosis, also known as nonfilarial elephantiasis, is a disease of the lymphatic vessels of the lower extremities that is caused by chronic exposure to irritant soils. It is the second most common cause of tropical lymphedema after lymphatic filariasis, and it is characterized by prominent swelling of the lower extremities, which leads to disfigurement and disability. Methods of prevention include wearing shoes and using floor coverings. Mainstays of treatment include daily foot hygiene, compression bandaging, and when warranted, surgery of overlying nodules.

== Signs and symptoms ==
Podoconiosis causes bilateral yet asymmetrical leg swelling with overlying firm nodules. Early on, symptoms may include itching, tingling, widening of the forefoot, and swelling which then progress to soft edema, skin fibrosis, papillomatosis, and nodule formation resembling moss, giving rise to the disease's alternate name of "mossy foot" in some regions of the world. The edema specifically begins at the foot and is initially reversible. Overtime it progresses to just below the knee. As with other forms of tropical lymphedema, chronic disease can lead to rigid toes, ulceration, and bacterial superinfection. During acute episodes of adenolymphangitis, patients may develop fevers, extremity warmth, redness, and pain. These episodes are extremely debilitating and account for many days of activity and productivity loss each year.

=== Psychological consequences ===
As a result of its appearance, podoconiosis can cause social stigmatization and discrimination. People with podoconiosis also report a lower quality of life than people in similar neighborhood circumstances except without podoconiosis and also higher levels of mental distress and depression.

== Causes ==
Podoconiosis has been seen to occur in patients who are genetically susceptible and come into chronic contact with red clay soil. The disease is primarily seen in the rural highlands due to the formation of the irritant soil requiring 1500mm of rainfall at 1500m altitude. The red nature of the soil is related to the alkelic volcanic bedrock the soil sits on, further explaining the geographic preference of the disease. Though no singluar component of the soil has been proven to be the inciting factor, current suspects are kaolinite, smectite, micas, quartz, iron oxides, and trace elements. One study analyzed soil samples from regions with podoconiosis and compared it to regions without podoconiosis. The study found that those regions with podoconiosis were highly enriched with kaolinite and gibbsite due to leeching from the volcanic bedrock. Volcanic soils are known to contain a high amount of quartz which has been seen to pierce skin on bare feet, which could be contributing to podoconiosis development. Though there is data behind these components potentially contributing to podoconiosis, it is still unclear if these are coincidences or true inciting factors.

Farmers walking barefoot on red clay soil in rural highlands of Ethiopia.

The genetic component of podoconiosis was recognized in 1972 within a family of Ethiopians afflicted with the disease. Another study done in Wolaita found heritability of 63% and a sibling risk ratio of 5.07.

=== Pathophysiology ===
According to the World Health Organization, "Evidence suggests that podoconiosis is the result of a genetically determined abnormal inflammatory reaction to mineral particles in irritant red clay soils derived from volcanic deposits".

The pathophysiology of podoconiosis is a combination of genetic susceptibility, possibly through associations with HLA-DQA1, HLA-DQB1, and HLA-DRB1 variants, and a cumulative exposure to irritant soil. In susceptible individuals, irritant soil particles penetrate the feet, interact with macrophages, and collect in regional lymph nodes and lymphatic vessels. Over time, chronic inflammation within the lymphatic vessels leads to fibrosis and occlusion.

== Diagnosis ==
Diagnosing Podoconiosis can be challenging due to the lack of diagnostic tools in the rural communities it's most prevalent in, minimal understanding of the causes, and the lack of general awareness. This is especially alarming due to the time sensitive nature of the disease and potential reversibility if caught early on.

=== Differential diagnosis ===
The differential diagnosis for podoconiosis includes other causes of tropical lymphedema, such as filariasis or leprosy, and mycetoma pedis.

While filariasis is generally unilateral, podoconiosis affects the legs bilaterally albeit asymmetrically and in an ascending manner. Podoconiosis very rarely affects the groin while filariasis frequently involves the groin: a high ratio of lymphoedema/hydrocele cases in an area suggests podoconiosis as the dominant cause of lymphedema. In some cases, the history and clinical presentation alone cannot differentiate between the two causes of tropical lymphedema. Local epidemiology can also be a clue to diagnosis, as podoconiosis is typically found in higher altitude areas with volcanic soils while filariasis is common in low-lying areas where mosquitos are prevalent. Blood smears for identification of microfilariae and antigen detection techniques can be helpful in the diagnosis of lymphatic filariasis.

Lepromatous lymphedema can also mimic podoconiosis clinically, but the former will have a loss of sensation in the toes and feet, thickened nerves, and trophic ulcers. Other causes of lymphedema include Kaposi sarcoma, mycetoma, and elephantiasis nostras verrucosa.

== Prevention ==
Elimination of podoconiosis relies on prevention with widespread shoe implementation, stringent foot hygiene, and floor coverings. Community-based initiatives are crucial to achieving the elimination of this disease. In Ethiopia, The Mossy Foot Treatment and Prevention Association (now Mossy Foot International) works to transform patients into community podoconiosis agents who in turn visit patients, teach basic treatment techniques such as foot hygiene, and educate families about the disease. This model has been adapted by several other non-government groups as they have started programs in other regions of Ethiopia.

In 2011, podoconiosis was added to the World Health Organization's neglected tropical diseases list, which was an important milestone in raising global awareness of the condition. Additional theories for prevention entail reducing contact with soils known to incite the disease. These easy prevention strategies have led to hope that podoconiosis can be realistically controlled.

== Management ==
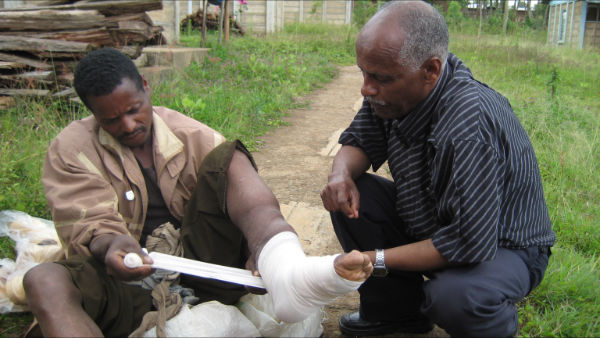
This patient is receiving compression bandages as treatment for podoconiosis.

The cornerstone of the prevention and treatment of podoconiosis is avoidance of exposure to irritant soils. Wearing shoes in the presence of irritant soils is the primary method of exposure reduction. In Rwanda, a country of high disease prevalence, the government has banned walking barefoot in public, to prevent podoconiosis and other soil-borne diseases. Increasing the availability of footwear must be coupled with education on the benefits of wearing shoes as cultural influences, such as barefoot traditions, can hinder widespread use of footwear.

Management of podoconiosis entails foot hygiene, compression, exercise, and elevation. A randomized trail was performed in the rural regions of Ethiopia that entailed adminstering self care packages that consisted of foot hygeine instructions, emollient based skin care, bandaging material, exercise/elevation instructions, shoes and socks. This reduced acute attacks in the defined region 19% after 12 months. Often overlooked is the mental health support that is also important due to the stigma associated with the condition. Nodules will not resolve with these conservative measures, although surgical removal of the nodules can be performed. The removal of these nodules have been seen to have positive impacts on patients and allows them to have custom shoes.

== Epidemiology ==
Regions that podoconiosis is most prevalent.

Podoconiosis is most frequently seen in the highland areas of Africa, India, and Central America. The highest prevalence is seen in Uganda, Tanzania, Kenya, Rwanda, Burundi, Sudan, and Ethiopia. A recent review has summarized the global distribution of podoconiosis. In some areas of Ethiopia, the prevalence is as high as 4%. The incidence of podoconiosis increases with age, likely due to cumulative exposure to irritant soil. It is very rare to see podoconiosis in the 0–5 year-old age group, and the incidence rapidly rises from 6 to 20 years of age, with the highest prevalence after 45 years of age. Podoconiosis is most commonly seen in higher altitude areas with volcanic soil, and it is estimated to affect 4 million people worldwide. Productivity losses associated with the disease are significant. The amount of people affected in Ethiopia is 1.5 million, "40 000 in Cameroon, 9000 in Kenya and 7000 in Rwanda". The condition is thought to have caused US $200 million in lost productivity per year in 2004.

Though podoconiosis is most prevalent in Africa, there have been cases outside the continent. The data is limited yet a global systemic review found prevalance of .21% in India with a singular case seen in Brazil.

== History ==
After parasitic filariae were discovered to be an important cause of tropical lymphedema in the 19th century, early investigators assumed that filariae were the sole cause of lymphedema in the tropics. It was later discovered that the distribution of tropical lymphedema and filariasis did not perfectly overlap, and researchers began to recognize that some forms of tropical lymphedema were not associated with filariasis. Ernest W Price, a British surgeon living in Ethiopia, discovered the true etiology of podoconiosis in the 1970s and 1980s by studying the lymph nodes and vessels of those afflicted with the disease. Using light microscopy, he observed macrophage cells laden with micro-particles in lymph nodes of the affected extremity. After examining the same tissue using electron microscopy, he could identify the presence of silicon, aluminum, and other soil metals both in the phagosomes of macrophages and adhered to the surface of lymphocytes. Price demonstrated that the lymphatic vessels of these patients experienced subendothelial edema and eventual collagenization of the lumen leading to complete blockage. He wrote a monograph on podoconiosis which was published after his death in 1990.

== Society and Culture ==
There is a strong social stigma prevalent in Ethiopia, Cameroon, and Rwanda towards patients afflicted with podoconiosis. An Ethiopian systemic review showed that the stigma associated with podoconiosis prevented patients from attending social gatherings, funerals, religious services, and clinics/hospitals even if it was for a different medical condition. A cross-sectional Cameroon study surmised that patients affected with podoconiosis shared similar stigma and quality of life to those afflicted with leprosy.

== Current situation ==
Podoconiosis is now recognised as one of the WHO Neglected Tropical Diseases, its importance as a public health problem is well recognised in Ethiopia. Footwork is a charity which brings together public and private partners to support prevention and treatment of podoconiosis. There is an active research group led by Gail Davey at the Wellcome Trust Brighton and Sussex Centre for Global Health Research which co-ordinates research worldwide. A recent article in The Lancet includes some excellent illustrations.
