= BMS World Mission =

Christian missionary society and charity

- Abbreviation: BMS
- Formation: 1792
- Type: Missionary Society
- Headquarters: Didcot, Great Britain
- General Director: Kang-San Tan
- Website: Official website

BMS World Mission, officially Baptist Missionary Society, is a Christian missionary society founded by Baptists from England in 1792. The headquarters is in Didcot, England.

== History ==
The BMS was formed in 1792 as the Particular Baptist Society for the Propagation of the Gospel Amongst the Heathen at a meeting in Kettering, England, where twelve Particular Baptist ministers signed an agreement. They were; Thomas Blundel, Joshua Burton, John Eayres, Andrew Fuller, Abraham Greenwood, William Heighton, Reynold Hogg, Samuel Pearce, John Ryland, Edward Sherman, John Sutcliff, Joseph Timms. William Staughton, present at the meeting, did not sign since he was not a minister. The first missionaries, William Carey and John Thomas, were sent to Bengal, India in 1793. They were followed by many co-workers, firstly to India, and subsequently to other countries in Asia, the Caribbean, Africa, Europe, and South America. BMS opened missions in China in 1860. It began operating in China's Shanxi province in 1877, despite local hostility toward “foreign devils.” In the Boxer Rebellion of 1900 all its missionaries there were killed, along with all 120 converts .

Francis Augustus Cox wrote a history of the Baptist Missionary Society from its formation until 1842. Brian Stanley was commissioned to write a history of the society for its bicentenary (1992).

It is also known as BMS World Mission since 2000.

== List of missionaries ==
- Rev. Samuel Pearce (1792)
- William Carey (1793)
- John Thomas (1793)
- Dr. William Yates (1814)
- Rev. Thomas Swan taught theology in India - later President of the Baptist Union in 1839
- Joseph Jackson Fuller (1825–1908), Jamaican missionary to Cameroon
- Jeremiah Phillips (1836)
- George Grenfell (1849–1906), explorer and BMS missionary in the Democratic Republic of the Congo
- Dr Clement Clapton Chesterman (1920–1936), the first to implement successfully mass chemotherapy for Trypanosomiasis. He worked at Yakusu in the Democratic Republic of the Congo.
- Timothy Richard was a well-known Baptist missionary to China.
- Dr Ernest W Price (1907–1990), the discoverer of Podoconiosis. He worked at Pimu and IME Kimpese in the Democratic Republic of the Congo.
- Dr Stanley George Browne (1907–1986), "Mister Leprosy". He succeeded Dr Chesterman at Yakusu in the Democratic Republic of the Congo.
- Charlotte White (1782–1863), American, first single woman appointed as a missionary; wife of BMS missionary Joshua Rowe, worked in Digha, India from 1816 to 1826.
- Dr David Hedley Wilson (1928–2015), the first President of the Royal College of Emergency Medicine. He succeeded Dr Price at Pimu and IME Kimpese in the Democratic Republic of the Congo.

== See also ==
- List of Protestant missionaries in China § English Baptist Missionary Society
- List of Protestant missionary societies in China (1807–1953)
- William Ward (missionary)
- Hong Kong Council of the Church of Christ in China
