= Peter Cheal =

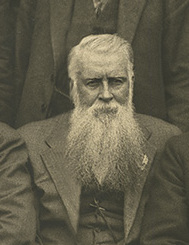
Cheal in 1927

Peter Edward Cheal (1846 – 12 January 1931) was a prominent surveyor in the settlement of New Zealand during the mid and late 19th century.

== Biography ==
=== London ===
Peter Edward Cheal was born and educated in London, where he trained as a mining engineer and surveyor and joined the Middlesex Engineering Volunteers.

=== New Zealand ===
==== Auckland ====
He emigrated to New Zealand in 1864 aboard the "Eagle Speed", and in 1865 joined the Survey Department in Auckland, assisting the Transport Corps during the Waikato campaign. He was licensed under the Native Land Act in 1865, and gazetted in 1870, spending much of the late 1860s surveying in the Thames goldfield and in Native Land Surveys.

==== Waimate Plains ====
In 1871 Cheal was appointed to the Waimate Plains in South Taranaki, where he was in charge of six survey parties, which consisted of 100 men each. Here Cheal and his parties came into conflict with Taranaki Māori under the leadership of Te Whiti and Tohu, who had Mr. Cheal and his staff placed in carts and removed from the plains. An Armed Constabulary unit numbering 800 men was sent to restore order, and with their protection the surveyors resumed their work.

==== Faith and family ====
Cheal was married to Eliza Shalders on 3 January 1876. Together they had four children; Ethel, May, Alfred and Ernest. Eliza was the daughter of leading Baptist minister Richard Barcham Shalders, the founder of the Auckland Baptist Tabernacle and the New Zealand branch of the YMCA. Cheal himself was a devout Christian, and would often hold evangelical services as part of his visitations to various surveying camps.

==== Taranaki ====
During the mid-late 1870s Cheal was involved with Edwin Stanley Brookes, Jnr. in the surveying of land on the eastern side of the mountain, surveying the town of Inglewood in 1875, and laying out the town of Stratford in 1879, where the nearby Cheal Road takes its name from the surveyor.

In 1881 Cheal took part in the march on Parihaka as a member of the Hāwera Cavalry.

==== Return to Auckland ====
In the 1880s Cheal returned to Thames where he was appointed in charge of the local Survey Office, and in 1886 he moved to Auckland where he established a private practice as a mining engineer and surveyor. He became a member of the New Zealand Institute of Surveyors in 1890. He was actively engaged in various parts of the Coromandel Peninsula during the mining boom of 1895, and continued his private practice in Auckland until 1919.

==== Death and legacy ====
Cheal died aged 84 years in Auckland in 1931. His son Alfred W. Cheal, and grandson Laurence H. Cheal, also went on to become surveyors and members of the New Zealand Institute of Surveyors.
