= Rookdale =

- Location within KwaZulu-Natal Location within South Africa
- Coordinates: 28.716°S 29.230°E
- Country: South Africa
- Province: KwaZulu-Natal
- District: uThukela
- Municipality: Okhahlamba

Area
  - Total: 11.03 km^{2} (4.26 sq mi)

Population (2011)
  - Total: 4,644
  - Density: 421.0/km^{2} (1,090/sq mi)

Racial makeup (2011)
  - Black African: 99.5%
  - Coloured: 0.1%
  - Indian/Asian: 0.2%
  - Other: 0.2%

First languages (2011)
  - Zulu: 93.6%
  - Sotho: 3.9%
  - Other: 2.6%
- Time zone: UTC+2 (SAST)
- PO box: 3351

Rookdale is a rural settlement, near Bergville, in Okhahlamba Local Municipality in the KwaZulu-Natal province of South Africa.

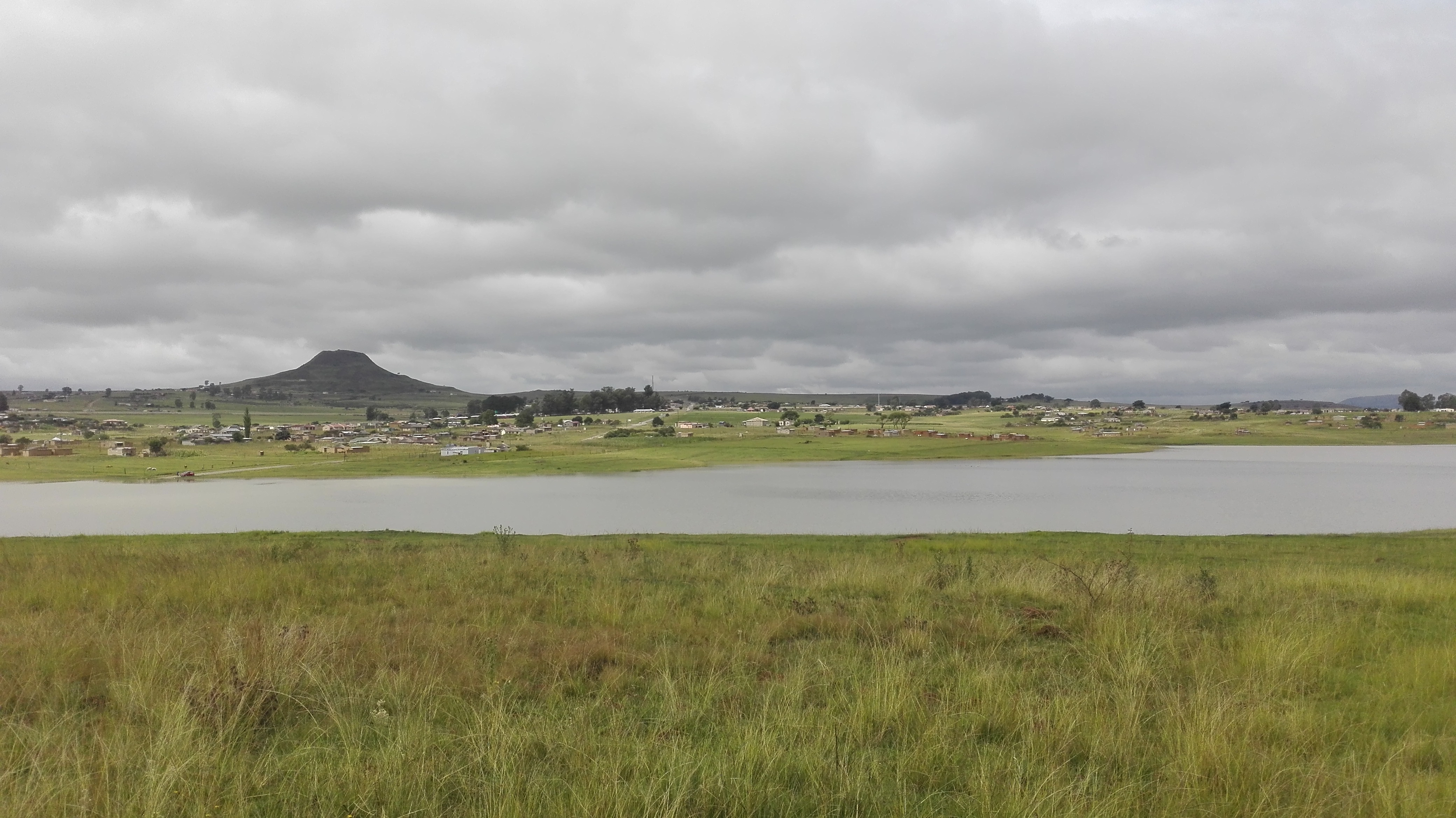
The lone standing eNdanyana Hill or Mountain is a landmark of Rookdale

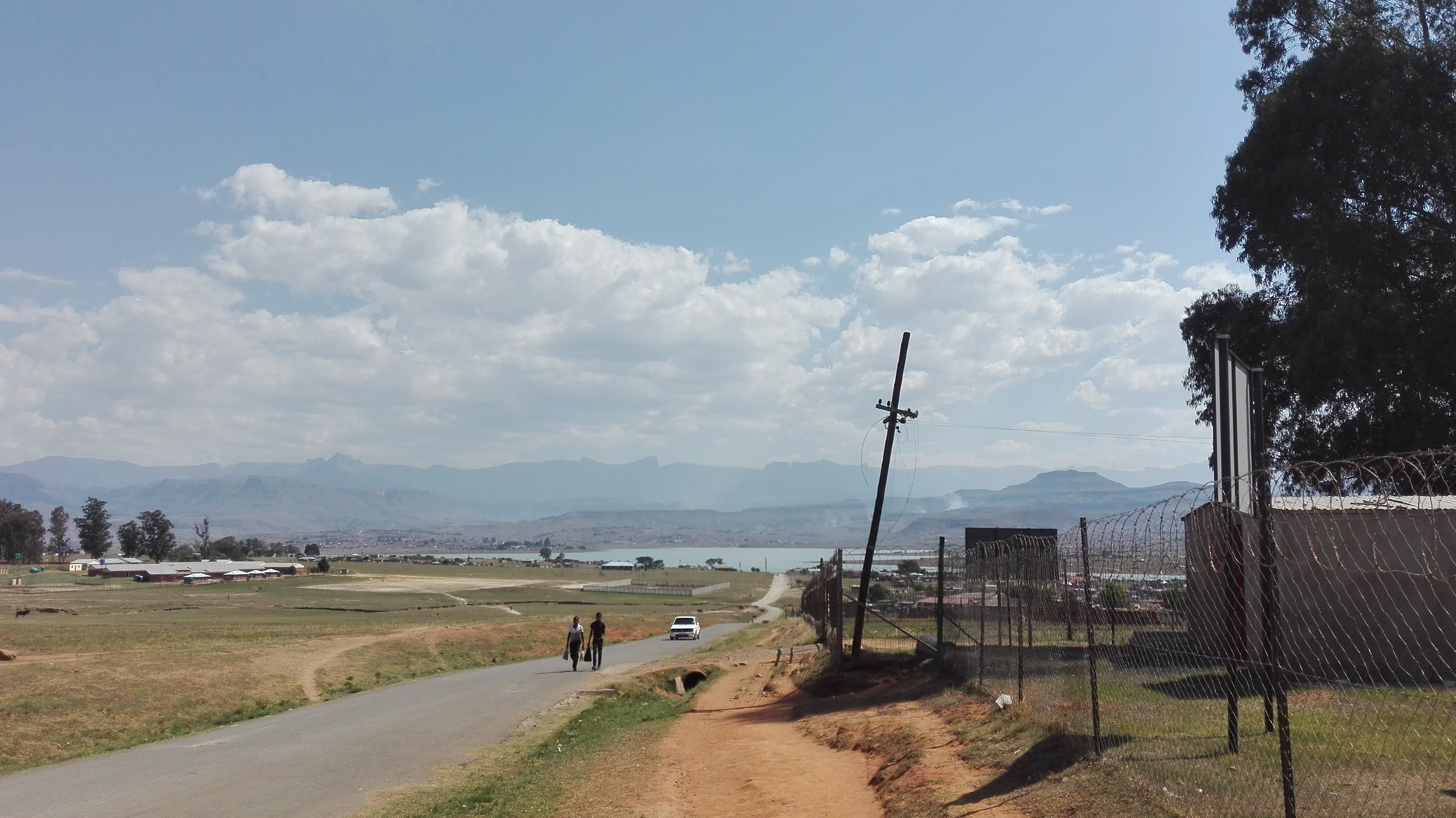
The Woodstock Dam and Drakensberg Mountains as seen from Rookdale

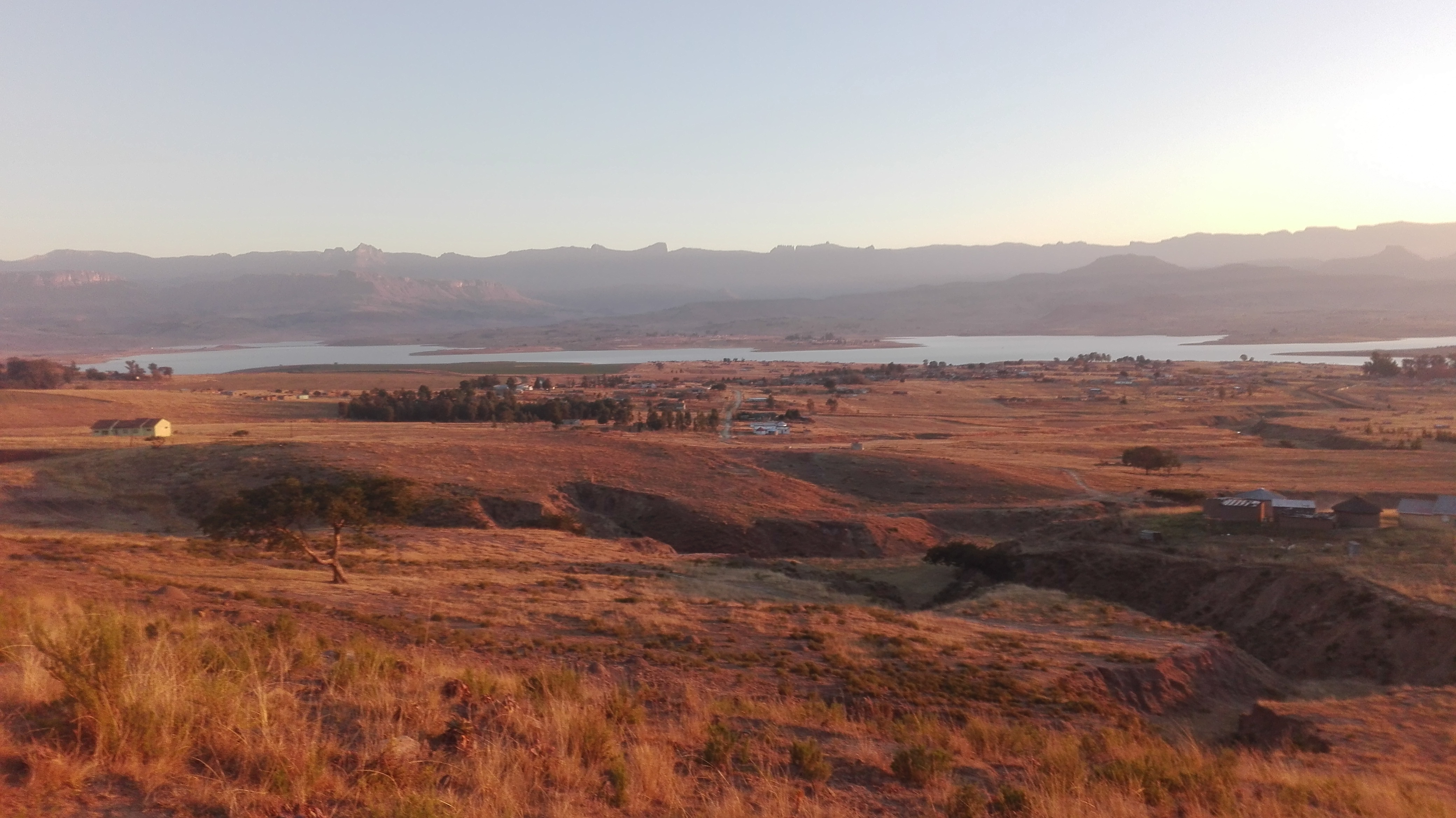
Sunset views from the middle of the hill Endanyana.

== History ==
A group of 12 Black and 4 Coloured men purchased the farm Rookdale and received titledeeds after 1915. The area of Rookdale spanned nearly 4000 acres and was bordered on the west by the Tugela River, across from which was the Upper Tugela Location, the traditional land of the Ngwane people.

Rookdale fell within the 13 percent of land in South Africa that was set aside for “Native” occupation and as such none of the land was expropriated under the Native Land Act of 1913. However due to the implementation of that Act in the surrounding countryside and the resultant black landlessness, many Rookdale land owners sold off portions of their own land or took on tenants. The community had a committee composed of Mr. Josiah Tshangana Gumede, former ANC President, a Mr. Applegreen and a Mr. Du Plooy who ensured that land was allocated for a cattle dip site, a cemetery, churches, and several schools.

This community has always been one in which many people are impoverished. In the late 1970s to early 1980s large swathes of Rookdale were expropriated to make way for the Woodstock Dam and many families lost their land and were moved away.
