= Richard Barcham Shalders =

Richard Barcham Shalders (1824–1914) was a Baptist preacher, founder of the New Zealand branch of the YMCA, and founder of Auckland Baptist Tabernacle.

== Biography ==
=== Childhood ===
Richard Barcham Shalders was born on 24 November 1824, to Jacob Shalders and Phoebe Shalders (née Barcham), at Worstead, Norfolk, England. His father owned a grocers and drapery shop, where he worked until moving to London at the age of 16. From his youth Shalders was devoutly religious, and it is apparent from his journals that his grandmother played a significant role in guiding him on matters of faith.

=== Dover and London ===
Shalders failed to find work in London, and instead accepted work at a high-class drapery establishment in Dover, where he met the woman he was to later marry, Eliza Rooke. He returned to London in August 1846, where he worked for Morrison, Dillon and Co. for two and a half years. While there he attended a YMCA Bible Class at Sergeant's Inn, 49 Fleet Street, under the leadership of Mr. T. H. Tarlton. He joined the local Baptist church under the pastorate of Rev’d John Howard Hinton, who was at the time reputed to be the "greatest and most original thinker in London". Shalders began prayer meetings at the warehouse, and in February 1849 Shalders left to work for I. and R. Morley.

=== Emigration to New Zealand ===
Two and a half years later Shalders decided to emigrate to New Zealand. He and his wife were married on 30 September 1851, and on 19 October the newly married couple departed from Gravesend aboard the "Katherine Stewart Forbes", reaching Auckland on 9 March 1852.

As the barque rounded the North Cape it almost foundered;

‘. . . No sound could be heard beside water rushing down into our cabin. (One poor sailor, the third mate, fell into the sea and was drowned.) The carpenter took an axe and knocked out the bulwarks and freed the decks of water. The ship rose again and we heard voices once more. My thought was: I shall yet stand on the shores of New Zealand to tell of the glorious Gospel of God.' – Shalders, Personal Reminiscences

Three and a half months after arriving, on 24 June, Eliza gave birth to their first child, Eliza, who went on to marry prominent New Zealand surveyor Peter Cheal.

=== Auckland Baptist Tabernacle ===
Upon arriving in Auckland Shalders began "Youth Scripture Conversational Classes" on the first Sabbath of each month at his home on Queen Street, and later at his new home on Chapel Street. In 1855 he joined with 14 other Auckland residents and founded the Auckland Baptist Tabernacle. A chapel was erected to seat 350 people on the corner of Federal and Wellesley Streets, and was later extended to seat 500. The pulpit of Auckland Baptist Tabernacle went on to be occupied by famous Baptist preachers such as Thomas Spurgeon, son of the great Charles Spurgeon, and also Joseph Kemp, founder of the New Zealand Bible Training Institute (now Laidlaw College).

=== YMCA New Zealand ===
In 1853, Shalders was invited to a meeting of the Wesleyan Sunday School Teachers, and there he announced his plans to form a New Zealand branch of the YMCA. Following this he gave a lecture at the Mechanics Institute on the rise, progress and influence of the London YMCA, and the issue of this was a resolution to commence an Auckland YMCA. A site was purchased on Durham Street East, and a building erected and opened on 12 September 1856 by His Excellency the Governor Gore Brown. The association quickly gained a significant following, with daily attendance averaging over 50. The following year Eliza Shalders gave birth to their second child, Alfred Barcham Shalders.

The YMCA was met with controversy in 1864, when Shalders was accused of using his influence for the purpose of furthering the interests of his own Baptist denomination. The accusations were denied, and Shalders survived in his position, however the buildings were burnt to the ground at three o'clock in the morning. A new building was erected in 1866.

Under Shalders' leadership YMCA centres were also established in Christchurch (1862), Wellington (1866), Nelson (1866), Dunedin (1874) and Invercargill (1876). Each YMCA was autonomous, but shared a common religious orientation – "bible study, religious and moralistic lectures, choirs and evangelical meetings".

=== Business ===
Shalders is remembered primarily as the founder of the YMCA and the Auckland Baptist Tabernacle, but he was also a very successful businessman. He owned a drapers' shop at 200 Queen Street, and also had properties at Kapanga Township, Coromandel; Huia Saw Mills; and 942 acres (3.81 km^{2}) at Point Long Nose, Awitu Block.

=== Retirement and death ===
Eliza died on 31 August 1908, aged 82, while Richard was still involved on the YMCA Committer. In 1912 he resigned, after 65 years of service to the YMCA, and he died two years later on 1 October 1914, aged 90.
