= Delavan Leonard Pierson =

Delavan L. Pierson
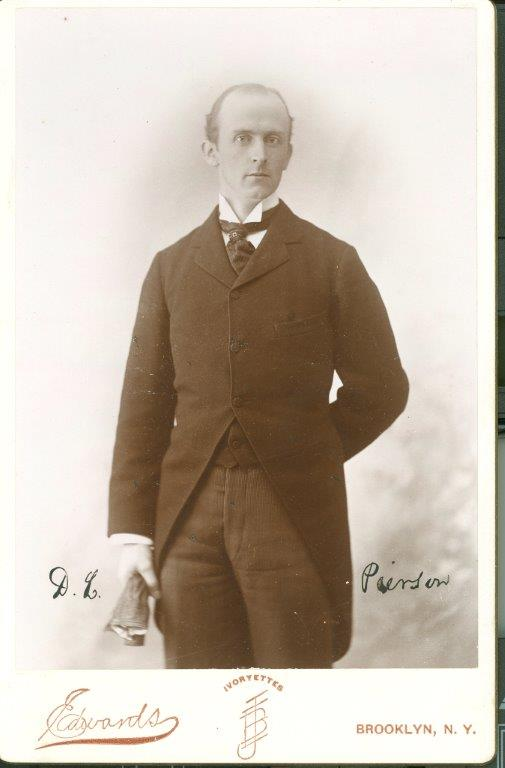

Delavan Leonard Pierson (1867–1952) was an American Presbyterian pastor, Christian leader, editor and writer. He was educated at Princeton University (B.A., 1890; M.A., 1894) and Princeton Theological Seminary (B.D., 1894), and was licensed by the Presbytery of New Brunswick in 1894. He was the first son of Arthur Tappan Pierson who was an American Presbyterian pastor, Christian Leader, and missionary to Korea where A. T. Pierson established the Pierson Memorial Bible School (now Pyeongtaek University) in Seoul in 1912. He had a distinguished career as a writer and as a Bible school superintendent, and was editor of The Northfield Echoes and of The Missionary Review of the World.
