= Shalders =

Shalders is a surname of English origin. People with the name include:

- Richard Shalders (born 1938), Australian politician
- Richard Barcham Shalders (1824–1914), New Zealand Baptist preacher
- Russ Shalders (born 1951), Royal Australian Navy officer
- Steven Shalders (born 1981), Welsh athlete
- William Shalders (1880–1917), South African cricketer
