= Susannah Spurgeon =

British author and wife of Charles Spurgeon

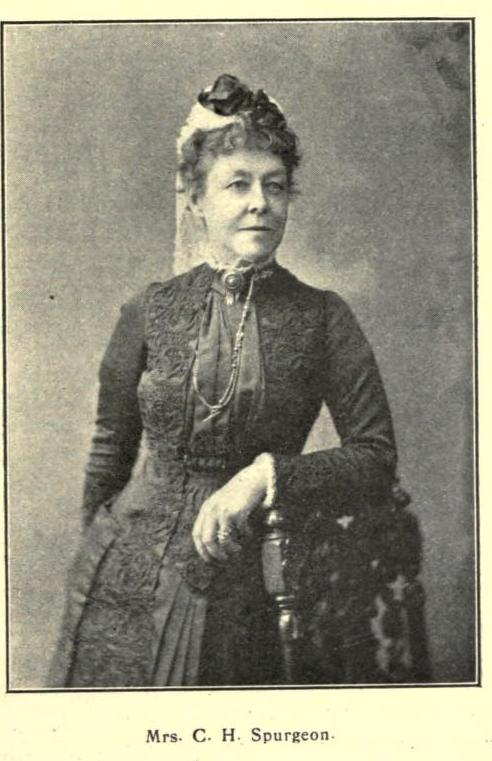
Susannah Spurgeon (Life of Charles Haddon Spurgeon by William Young Fullerton)

Susannah Spurgeon (née Thompson; 15 January 1832 – 22 October 1903) was a British author and wife of Charles Spurgeon.

Susannah Thompson married Charles Spurgeon on 8 January 1856. They had twin sons, Charles and Thomas, born on 20 September 1856. She had gynecological-related health issues, and was operated on by James Young Simpson in 1869. She spent much of the rest of her life as an invalid.

She was known for her staunch support of her husband's ministry, and for the Book Fund which she established in 1875, through which by the time of her death 200,000 theological books had been distributed to needy pastors. She wrote several books of her own, starting with Ten Years of My Life in the Service of the Book Fund (1886). She also served as coeditor of and major contributor to her husband's Autobiography.

Ray Rhodes Jr. argues that all of her work grew from "Susie's commitment to labor for the glory of God, the good of many, and the promotion of her husband's legacy."
