= Spurgeons =

British children's charity

Spurgeons is a large national children's charity in the United Kingdom, working with vulnerable families, children and young people. It is based in Rushden, with several offices in the UK, and is a registered charity.

Spurgeons currently delivers more than 81 projects reaching over 37,000 children and 78,000 parents or carers every year.

The Christian charity works in partnership with local authorities, churches, charitable foundations and other supporters.

== History of Stockwell Orphanage 1867 to Spurgeons 2005 ==
Spurgeons was founded in 1867 by Charles Haddon Spurgeon. as Stockwell Orphanage - due to its location.

The inspiration for starting an orphanage came from a visit with George Muller. and then spurred on by a donation of £20,000 by Anne Hillyard. However, it wasn't this £20,000 that was used to fund the beginning of the orphanage. Spurgeon records in the 1876 publicationThe Metropolitan Tabernacle. Its History and Works that the gift was railway debentures and a 'financial panic' meant that they couldn't be realised. Spurgeon then records that others gave to allow the land to be bought and houses to be built.

This involvement of individuals in the Orphanage continued throughout Spurgeon's life. In each monthly Sword and Trowel he recorded the gifts given. In the issue of December 1889 Spurgeon records that between October 15 and November 14 158 separate individuals, 275 collectors and 15 Orphanage choir appearances netted £797/12/1. This opened for boys in 1867 and for girls in 1879.

The orphanage continued in London until they were bombed in the Second World War. The orphanage changed its name to Spurgeon's Child Care in 1937, and again in 2005 to Spurgeons.

Spurgeons was founded as a compassionate and distinctively Christian response to the plight of orphaned and vulnerable children in London. Motivated by their faith, Charles Haddon Spurgeon and his associates sought to provide shelter, education and a loving environment for the city's most vulnerable children.

The orphanage was founded on the 'family principle' which was viewed positively in 1878 by the Government report authored by Mouat and Bowly:

” – The Stockwell Orphanage, founded by the Rev. C. H. Spurgeon, is an institution of a higher order than the reformatories and pauper schools, and is not an industrial school properly so called. It is devoted to the education and training of fatherless boys, and is supported entirely by voluntary contributions in money or kind. The feature which caused us to visit it with reference to the present inquiry is that it is based on the family system, there being eight separate houses, in each of which resides a group of about thirty boys under the special charge of a matron. Each house contains dormitories for the boys, and apartments for the matron, also a lavatory, and the usual offices; but the meals are taken in a general dining hall, and cooked in a general kitchen; an arrangement which doubtless conduces to economy, but which is to some extent departure from the ideal family system. “The boys’ houses are arranged in a continuous terrace, each house being separated from the next by a party wall as in an ordinary street, the schoolrooms are on a third floor over a portion of the terrace, and are commodious and airy. The standard of education is high, as one of the avowed purposes of the institution is to get the boys ‘to take good positions in the world.’ There is a general play-hall and swimming bath, and it was stated to us that nearly every boy was able to swim. “The standard of health is high; there is no general contagious disease in the school, and infectious fevers, when they occur, are easily prevented from spreading by early isolation, in the convenient detached infirmary standing at the southeast end of the playground. “The institution has been ten years at work, and the boys placed out in situations during that time have, as a rule, turned out well. “In many respects, this excellent school affords no ground of comparison with pauper institutions; but the point to be specially noted is that the family system, even in the modified form here adopted, is stated to have been productive of undoubtedly good effects, not only as regards the formation of individual character, but also as conducting to a high standard of bodily health.”

The original orphanage, in Stockwell, opened in 1869 for fatherless boys until ten years later when girls were welcomed to the orphanage. At this point there were 500 children living there.

In 1892 Charles Spurgeon died, however his work continued to improve the lives of the children in the orphanage.

In 1939, when the Second World War was announced, the children living in the Stockwell orphanage had to be evacuated. The majority of the children were moved to St David's in Reigate, Surrey.

After the war the children briefly stayed at St David's as they were unable to return to Stockwell Orphanage due to the bomb damage.

In 1951 the home in Birchington, Kent was opened and became the new children's home for Spurgeons. By 1953 all of the children had been relocated to the new home.

The children's home remained opened until 1979 when the children were sent to smaller homes or foster families.

From 1991 Spurgeons carried out international work in Romania, Kenya, Nigeria and Moldova. This international work was passed onto other organisations in 2011.

== Children's Centres ==
Spurgeons runs over 50 Children's Centres across the UK.

Their services include:

- Young parents groups
- Supporting parent and child relationships, family therapy and nurturing
- Baby clinics
- Stay and play sessions
- Father support groups

== Young Carers ==
Their services include:

- Information, advice and practical help for the family
- Educational, training and homework support
- One-to-one tailored support
- Transition support
- Mentoring support

== Families and Criminal Justice ==
Spurgeons run child focused visitors centres in a number of prisons. These include:

- HMP Belmarsh
- HMP Brixton
- HMP Feltham
- HMP Isis
- HMP Woodhill
- HMP Pentonville
- HMP Wandsworth
- HMP Wormwood Scrubs
- HMP Winchester

Spurgeons also offers targeted programmes for young offenders or those at risk of offending – including mentoring for young people in custody, through the gate, and family based intervention to prevent offending and reoffending.

=== Invisible Walls ===
Spurgeons also provide a project called ‘Invisible Walls’. Spurgeons’ Invisible Walls family support service is based at HMP/YOI Winchester, a local Category B/C prison. The service works in partnership with the prison and a range of agencies to support fathers in custody and their families in a range of ways.
