= Arthur Tappan Pierson =

Evangelical pastor and author

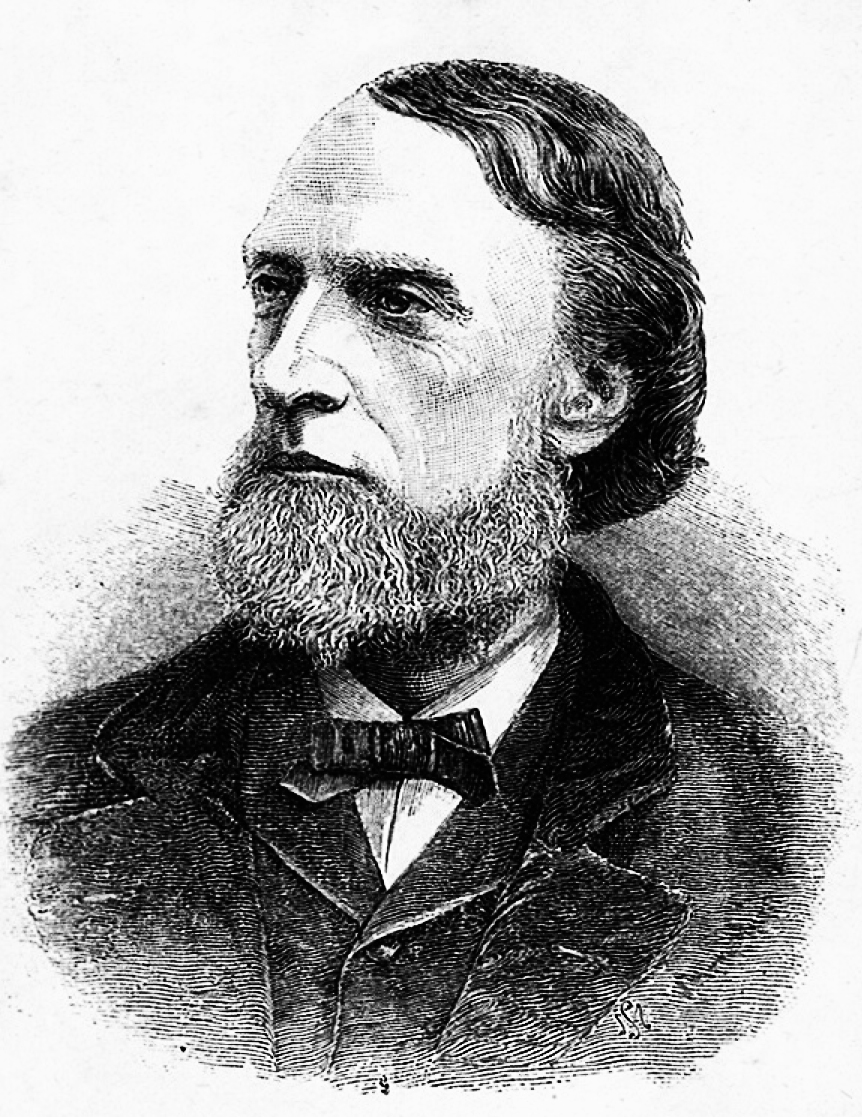
- Born: March 6, 1837; New York City, US
- Died: June 3, 1911 (aged 74)
- Occupations: Pastor, author
- Spouse: Sarah Frances Pierson (née Benedict) (1860)
- Children: 7

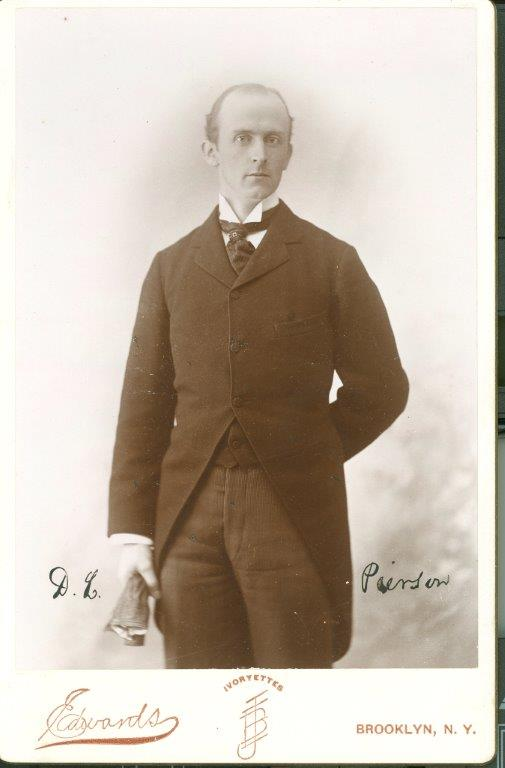
His first son Delavan Leonard Pierson at the age of Princeton University

Arthur Tappan Pierson (March 6, 1837 – June 3, 1911) was an American Presbyterian pastor, Christian leader, missionary and writer who preached over 13,000 sermons, wrote over fifty books, and gave Bible lectures as part of a transatlantic preaching ministry that made him famous in Scotland, England, and Korea. He was a consulting editor for the original "Scofield Reference Bible" (1909) for his friend, C. I. Scofield and was also a friend of D. L. Moody, George Müller (whose biography George Muller of Bristol he wrote), Adoniram Judson Gordon, and C. H. Spurgeon, whom he succeeded in the pulpit of the Metropolitan Tabernacle, London, from 1891 to 1893. Throughout his career, Pierson filled several pulpit positions around the world as an urban pastor who cared passionately for the poor.

Pierson was also a pioneer advocate of faith missions who was determined to see the world evangelized in his generation. Prior to 1870, there had been only about 2000 missionaries from the United States in full-time service, roughly ten percent of whom had engaged in work among Native Americans. A great movement of foreign missions began in the 1880s and accelerated into the 20th century, in some measure due to the work of Pierson. He acted as the elder statesman of the student missionary movement and was the leading evangelical advocate of foreign missions in the late 19th century. After retiring, he visited Korea in 1910. His visiting established the Pierson Memorial Union Bible Institute (today Pyeongtaek University) in 1912. Delavan Leonard Pierson was his first son. He was buried in Green-Wood Cemetery.

== Career ==
Pierson was the ninth child of Stephen and Sallie Pierson, a family with strong Christian and abolitionist roots. Born in New York City, he was named after Arthur Tappan, the famous New York abolitionist.

While attending a Methodist revival meeting in 1850 at the age of 13, he first publicly professed faith in Jesus Christ.

He graduated from Hamilton College, Clinton, New York, in 1857, and Union Theological Seminary (1869).

In 1860, he had married Sarah Frances Benedict; they had seven children, all of whom professed conversion to Christianity before the age of 15 and later served as missionaries, pastors, or lay leaders.

At the age of forty, while serving as pastor of the largest church in Detroit, he attended a series of evangelistic messages and realized he was prideful and greedy, and had sought the approval of the rich. As a result, he led his wealthy congregation to reach out to the poor of Detroit. He then moved to banish the practice of pew rents and committed to accept his salary on a faith basis.

In 1889–90 he made a missionary tour of the United Kingdom. Since 1888 he was editor of the Missionary Review of the World, and was lecturer on missions in Rutgers College in 1891 and Duff lecturer in Scotland in 1892.

When Charles Spurgeon's illness with Bright's disease kept him from preaching, he asked Pierson to substitute for him while he recovered; but when Spurgeon unexpectedly died on January 31, 1892, the people of the Metropolitan Tabernacle invited Pierson to stay on, which he did for the next two years. It is notable that Spurgeon asked a Presbyterian minister who had not been baptized as a believer to occupy the pulpit in his place. Pierson held the opinion that Christians could disagree on the mode of baptism and whether it should be administered to infants or believers only. He later became convinced that believer baptism was correct and on February 1, 1896, was baptized by Spurgeon's brother, James A. Spurgeon at the age of fifty-eight.

Pierson spoke with D. L. Moody at his Northfield Conferences and was also a speaker at the Keswick Convention who promoted holiness piety. During this period George Mueller and others had helped to change Pierson's eschatology from postmillennialism to premillennialism. As a missionary speaker A. T. Pierson influenced Robert Elliott Speer, Samuel Zwemer, Horace Grant Underwood and John R. Mott, Nobel Peace Prize winner, to give their lives to missions.

Besides his contributions to missions, Pierson's most notable influence was due to his commitment to orthodoxy. When liberalism began sweeping through the mainline denominations, Pierson joined other concerned Christian leaders in publishing "The Fundamentals", a series of booklets designed to answer the critics of Christianity. Because of his apologetic abilities, Pierson was invited to write five of the major articles. Each booklet was distributed freely to pastors throughout America. This marked the beginning of the Fundamentalist–Modernist Controversy in American churches. In time, the booklets were combined into a twelve volume set of books, which are still available today in a five volume set. Since then, Pierson has often been called the "Father of Fundamentalism".

One of his most significant books was, In Christ Jesus (1898), where he came to the conclusion that this brief phrase "in Christ Jesus" a preposition followed by a proper name was the key to understanding the entire New Testament. Pierson was an advocate of day-age creationism.

After retiring, he continued to preach at churches and conferences at home and abroad. He visited Korea in 1910, taught the Bible in a few churches (Namdaemoon church), and he died in 1911. Pierson Memorial Union Bible Institute, present Pyeongtaek University, was established according to the will of Dr. Arthur Tappan Pierson on October 15, 1912. Many pastors and scholars came from it. On Pierson's gravestone was a picture on an open Bible. On the Bible were engraved two verses. I John 5:11 "God hath given to us eternal life, and this life is in His Son." Matthew 28:19 "Go ye therefore, and teach all nations, baptizing them in the name of the Father, and of the Son, and of the Holy Ghost."

== Pierson's pastorates ==
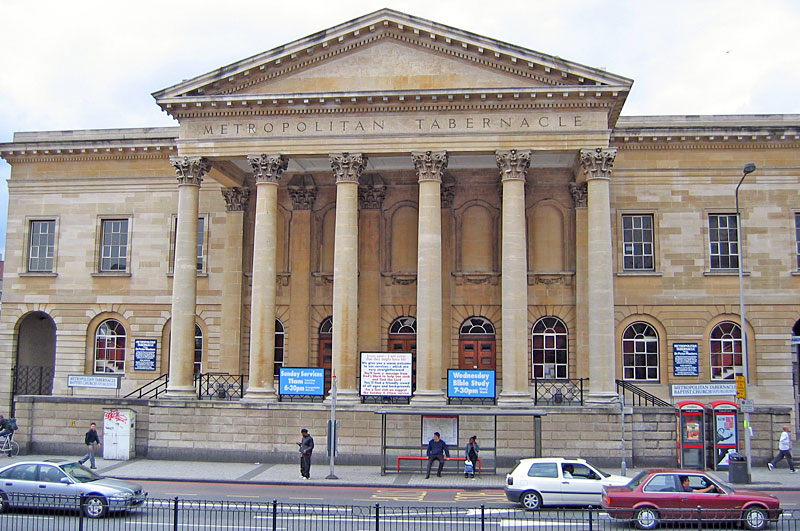
Metropolitan Tabernacle in 2004

- Congregational Church at Winsted, Connecticut, in the summers of 1859 and 1869
- Binghamton, New York (1860–1863)
- Waterford, New York (1863–69)
- Fort Street Presbyterian Church, Detroit (1869–82)
- Second Presbyterian Church (Indianapolis, Indiana), (1882–83)
- Bethany Collegiate Presbyterian Church, Philadelphia (1883,89)
- Metropolitan Tabernacle, London (1891–93)
- Christ Church, London (1902–03).

== Published works ==
- The Crisis of Missions (New York, 1886)
- Many Infallible Proofs: Chapters on the Evidences of Christianity (1886)
- Evangelistic Work in Principle and Practise (1887)
- Keys to the Word: or, Helps to Bible Study (1887)
- The One Gospel or, The Combination of the Narratives of the Four Evangelists (1889)
- Stumbling Stones Removed from the Word of God (1891)
- The Divine Enterprise of Missions (1891)
- Miracles of Missions (4 vols., 1891–1901)
- The Divine Art of Preaching (1892)
- From the Pulpit to the Palm-Branch: Memorial of Charles H. Spurgeon (1892)
- The Heart of the Gospel (sermons; 1892)
- New Acts of the Apostles (1894)
- LifePower: or, Character Culture, and Conduct (1895)
- Lessons in the School of Prayer (1895)
- Acts of the Holy Spirit (1895)
- The Coming of the Lord (1896)
- Shall we continue in Sin? (1897)
- In Christ Jesus: or, The Sphere of the Believer's Life (1898)
- Catharine of Siena, an ancient Lay Preacher (1898)
- George Muller of Bristol and his Witness to a Prayer-Hearing God (1899)
- Forward Movements of the last half Century (1900)
- Seed Thoughts for Public Speakers (1900)
- The Modern Mission Century viewed as a Cycle of Divine Working (1901)
- The Gordian Knot: or, The Problem which baffles Infidelity (1902)
- The Keswick Movement in Precept and Practice (1903)
- God's Living Oracles (1904)
- The Bible and Spiritual Criticism (1906)
- The Bible and Spiritual Life (1908)
- Godly Self-control (1909)

Religious titles
Preceded by Charles Spurgeon	Pastor of the Metropolitan Tabernacle; 1891–1893	Succeeded by Thomas Spurgeon
