= Auckland Baptist Tabernacle =

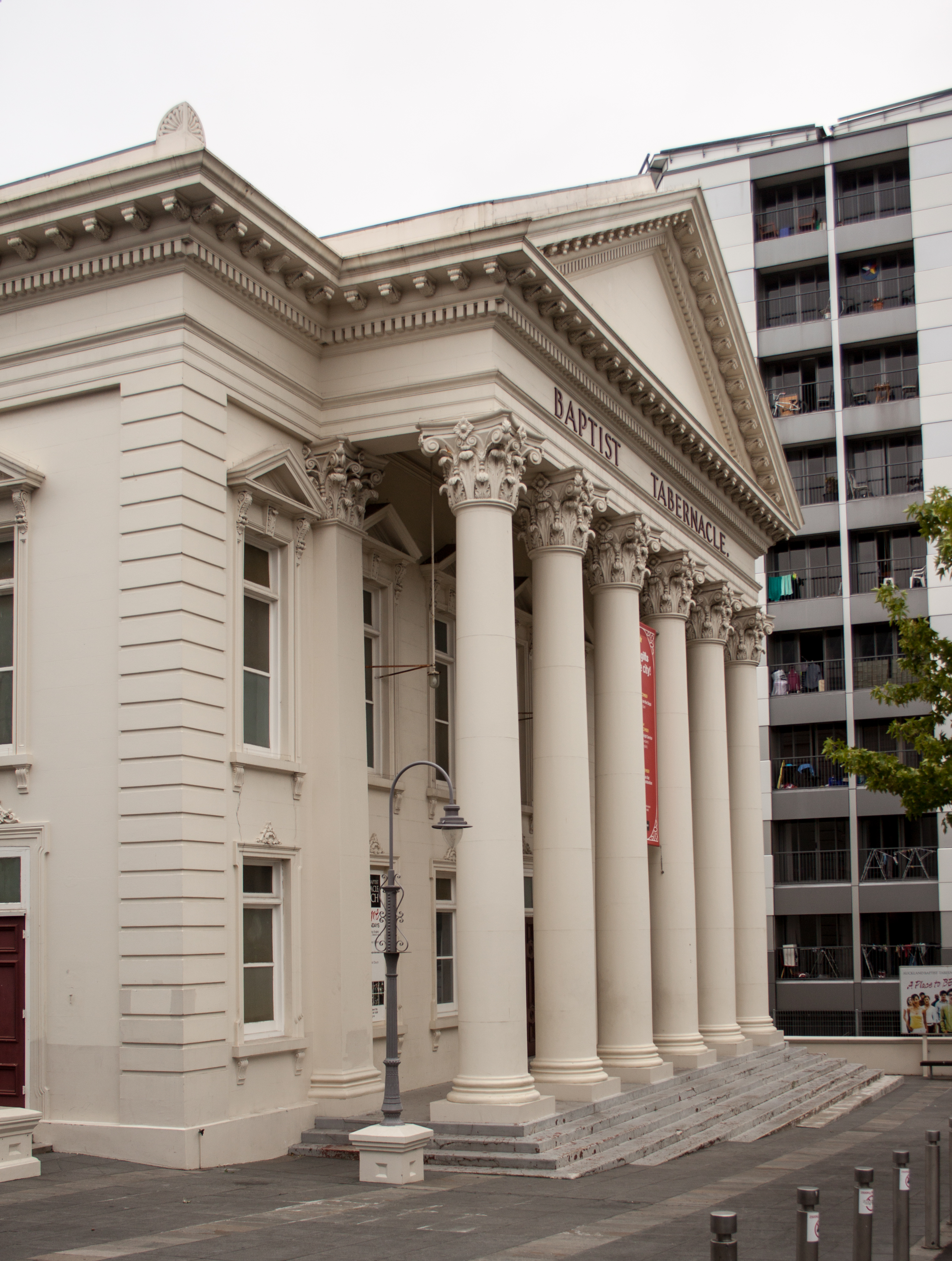
- The Auckland Baptist Tabernacle in 2016
- Auckland Baptist Tabernacle
- 36°51′27″S 174°45′41″E
- Location: 429 Queen Street, Auckland
- Country: New Zealand
- Denomination: Baptist

History
- Status: Tabernacle
- Founded: 1855

Architecture
- Functional status: Active
- Designated: 13 December 1991
- Architectural type: Roman Basilica
- Groundbreaking: Easter Monday 1884
- Completed: 12 May 1885
- Construction cost: NZ£14,000

Heritage New Zealand – Category 1
- Designated: 12 December 1996
- Reference no.: 7357

The Auckland Baptist Tabernacle is a Baptist church] located near the corner of Queen Street and Karangahape Road, at the edge of Auckland central business district in New Zealand. It is affiliated with the Baptist Churches of New Zealand.

== Description ==
The neo-classical building was designed by Edmund Bell and was inspired by the Metropolitan Tabernacle, likely at Thomas Spurgeon's suggestion. Capable of seating 1,500 it was the largest building in Auckland upon completion. The brick-structure features a hexastyle Corinthian portico with the sides being less ornately detailed, similar to the nearby Beresford Street Congregational Church. Unlike its inspiration the pediment lacks a balustrade..

== History ==
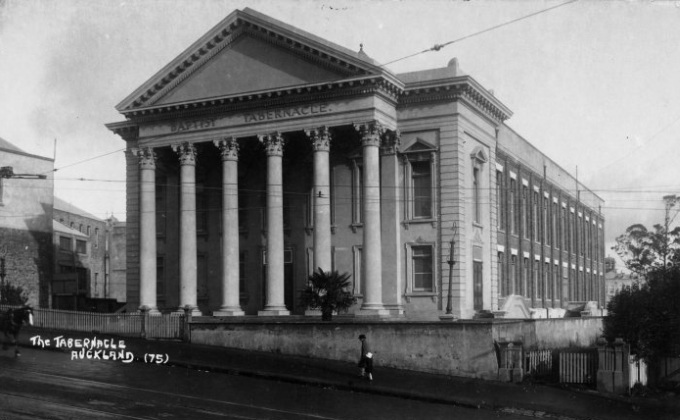
Auckland Baptist Tabernacle circa 1910

The Auckland Baptist Tabernacle was formed by Richard Shalders and 14 others in 1855 in the then fledgling colonial town of Auckland. By the late 1860s, a sizeable chapel had been built on Wellesley Street and the church flourished. Thomas Spurgeon, son of Charles Haddon Spurgeon, was appointed to the Auckland Baptist Tabernacle in 1882 and that same year the Baptist Union was formed. Spurgeon's presence helped to grow the congregation.

A prominent site at the top of Queen Street was secured. Initially it was intended that the church would face Karangahape Road but the plans were revised so it was actually constructed with the main façade on Queen Street. This meant the portico was visible from the harbour. Although one of the biggest buildings to be constructed in the city at the time, it took only one year to build from 1884 to 1885. As well as having very good acoustics its auditorium was also the largest room in the city, able to accommodate over 1500 people.

The building was opened to the wider community on 12 May 1885, where a special tithe was taken to cover the final £100, rendering the church debt free. Designed by a local architect Edmund Bell, the building was directly based on the Metropolitan Tabernacle in London and featured the same columned portico derived from the Pantheon in Rome. The building is listed by Heritage New Zealand as a Category I Historic Place.

A Greenwich clock was gifted by Greenwich Baptist Church, pastored by Thomas Spurgeon's non-identical twin brother. The clock remains a feature of the auditorium today.

One of the elders of the Baptist church who championed the construction of the Auckland Tabernacle was Charles Blomfield. Blomfield was a sign writer and interior decorator who operated from a shop adjacent to the Tabernacle, although he is mostly known for his landscape paintings, especially of the Pink and White Terraces. The neo-classical stencil work on the ceiling of the main auditorium was done by Charles and his brother Samuel.
