= Pyeongtaek University =

Private university in South Korea

Coordinates: 36.995°N 127.133°E

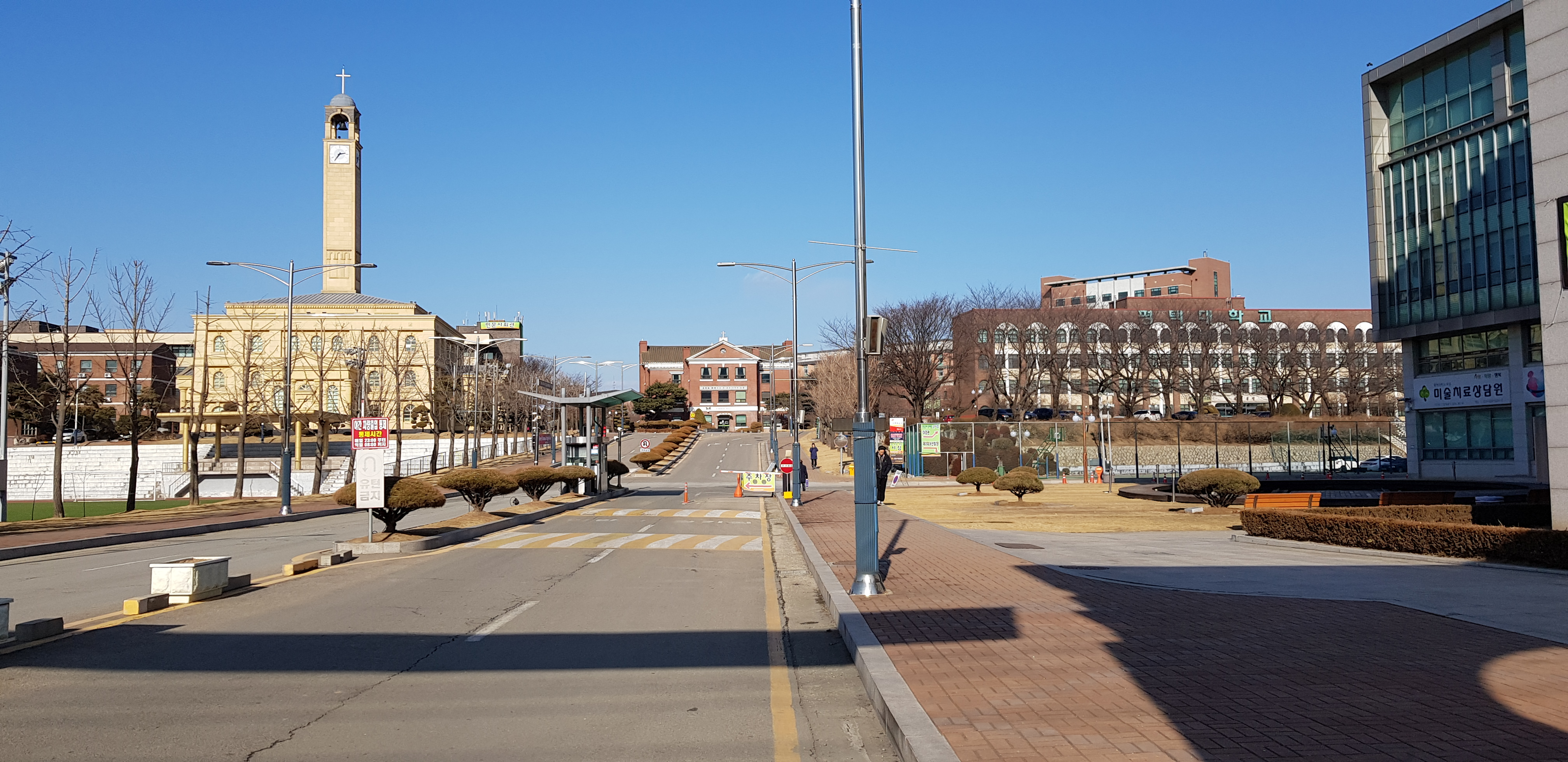
Pyeongtaek University

Pyeongtaek University (Korean: 평택대학교; Hanja: 平澤大學校) is a private research university located in Pyeongtaek, South Korea. Originating at Pierson Memorial Union Bible Institute in 1912, Pyeongtaek University is one of the oldest universities in South Korea.

== History ==
Pierson Memorial Union Bible Institute was established according to the will of Dr. Arthur Tappan Pierson on October 15, 1911. On December 29, 1980 Dr. Ki-Hung Cho applied and received juridical authorization to establish Pierson Memorial Institute Foundation and Pierson Bible Seminary raised to the status of a four-year formal school. On March 1, 1984 the school changed its name to Pierson College, and on March 1, 1996 Pierson University changed its name to Pyeongtaek University and Dr. Ki-Hung Cho inaugurated as the first president of Pyeongtaek University. In 2023 the President is LEE, Dong-Hyun.

== University Establishment Philosophy ==
=== University Ideals ===
Bible, Union, Mission

The university's ideals of 'Bible, Union, and Mission' reflect the founding spirit of the university. Following the wishes of Reverend Pierce, the founder of the university, Underwood, the first president and missionary, established the Pierce Memorial Union Bible School in 1912 in Seoul, which was an interdenominational institution. This reflected the founding spirit of Pierce, which emphasized Bible education and interdenominational missionary work.

=== Talent ===
Heart, Cooperation, Creativity

The university aims to nurture individuals with 'Heart (Biblical character), Cooperation (working with others), and Creativity (leading change through challenges)' who will lead transformation through creative challenges and collaboration with others.

=== Educational Purpose ===
Cultivating Practical Talents with a Christian Worldview and Creative Knowledge

The purpose of education is to cultivate practical talents with a Christian worldview and creative knowledge, thereby meeting the needs of the world and addressing societal demands.

=== Educational Objectives ===
- Character before Career: Nurturing individuals with Biblical character (Heart).
- Collaboration with Community: Nurturing individuals with collaborative abilities (Cooperation).
- Creativity toward Change: Nurturing individuals who lead change through creativity (Creativity).

'Character before Career' refers to cultivating individuals with Biblical character who can express logical thinking before choosing a career. 'Collaboration with Community' refers to nurturing individuals who understand others and work collaboratively to solve problems. 'Creativity toward Change' refers to nurturing individuals who lead change by exploring new fields through creative challenges.

=== University Vision ===
A Christian University that Transforms Communities and the World

The university's vision is that students, through the university's Christian educational programs, will lead change in their local communities and the global community.

=== Development Goals ===
ICT Convergence and International Logistics Hub University in the Yellow Sea Rim

This goal represents the future-oriented development of the university, linking it with the regional industry of Pyeongtaek and Pyeongtaek Port, aiming to specialize in ICT convergence and international logistics.

=== Seven Core Competencies ===
==== Connection Between Talent and Seven Core Competencies ====
Core Competencies and Their Meaning by Talent
Talent	Core Competency	Meaning of Core Competency	Competency Elements
Heart Talent	Character Competency	The ability to serve society based on a positive worldview and proper character	Positive self-image; Desirable interpersonal relationships; Community values
Heart Talent	Communication Competency	The ability to acquire knowledge, express one’s opinions, and listen to others	Knowledge acquisition ability; Knowledge delivery ability; Knowledge sharing ability
Cooperation Talent	Knowledge Convergence Competency	The ability to create new knowledge by merging existing knowledge	Convergent thinking ability; Knowledge and information application ability; New knowledge creation ability
Cooperation Talent	Collaboration Competency	The ability to create better value through communication and cooperation with others	Self-directed learning ability; Conflict management and mediation ability; Collective intelligence utilization ability
Cooperation Talent	Global Competency	The ability to lead the global society based on various languages, social, and cultural competencies	Foreign language communication ability; Cultural acceptance ability; International mindset
Creativity Talent	Problem-Solving Competency	The ability to diagnose and analyze problems and propose effective solutions	Critical thinking ability; Problem-solving ability; Team project execution ability
Creativity Talent	Pioneering and Challenging Competency	The ability to explore and design a career that matches one's talents and challenges proactively	Self-awareness ability; Career design ability; Career development ability

=== Five Key Strategies ===
Upgrade Strengthening educational competitiveness	Neighbor Specialization in the Yellow Sea Rim Hub University	Interaction Strengthening local cooperation	Organization Strengthening university infrastructure	Needs Enhancing service to demanders
A-1. Strengthening major curricula; A-2. Improving and strengthening general education curricula; A-3. Establishing a core competency management system; A-4. Introducing dual majors, convergence majors, and flexible semesters to improve academic administration; A-5. Ensuring proper class size; A-6. Strict course management; A-7. Strict grading management; A-8. Ongoing management of new student enrollment rates; A-9. Ongoing management of student retention rates; A-10. Managing the compensation level for part-time instructors; A-11. Proportion of courses taught by full-time faculty	B-1. Planning and strategy development for specialization areas; B-2. Reorganizing and planning for the operation of specialized business units	C-1. Strengthening social service; C-2. Contributing to the local community; C-3. Strengthening industry-academia cooperation	D-1. Creative structural reform; D-2. Selecting and training professionals; D-3. Improving educational return rates and tuition fees; D-4. Building educational infrastructure; D-5. Expanding student welfare facilities	E-1. Strengthening student learning support; E-2. Strengthening career and psychological counseling support; E-3. Enhancing employment support; E-4. Strengthening on-site internships and experiential education; E-5. Strengthening student entrepreneurship support; E-6. Strengthening student scholarship support; E-7. Supporting student activities and personal data protection; E-8. Improving support for minority students; E-9. Managing educational satisfaction of demanders

== Pictures ==
Pyeongtaek University Pictures

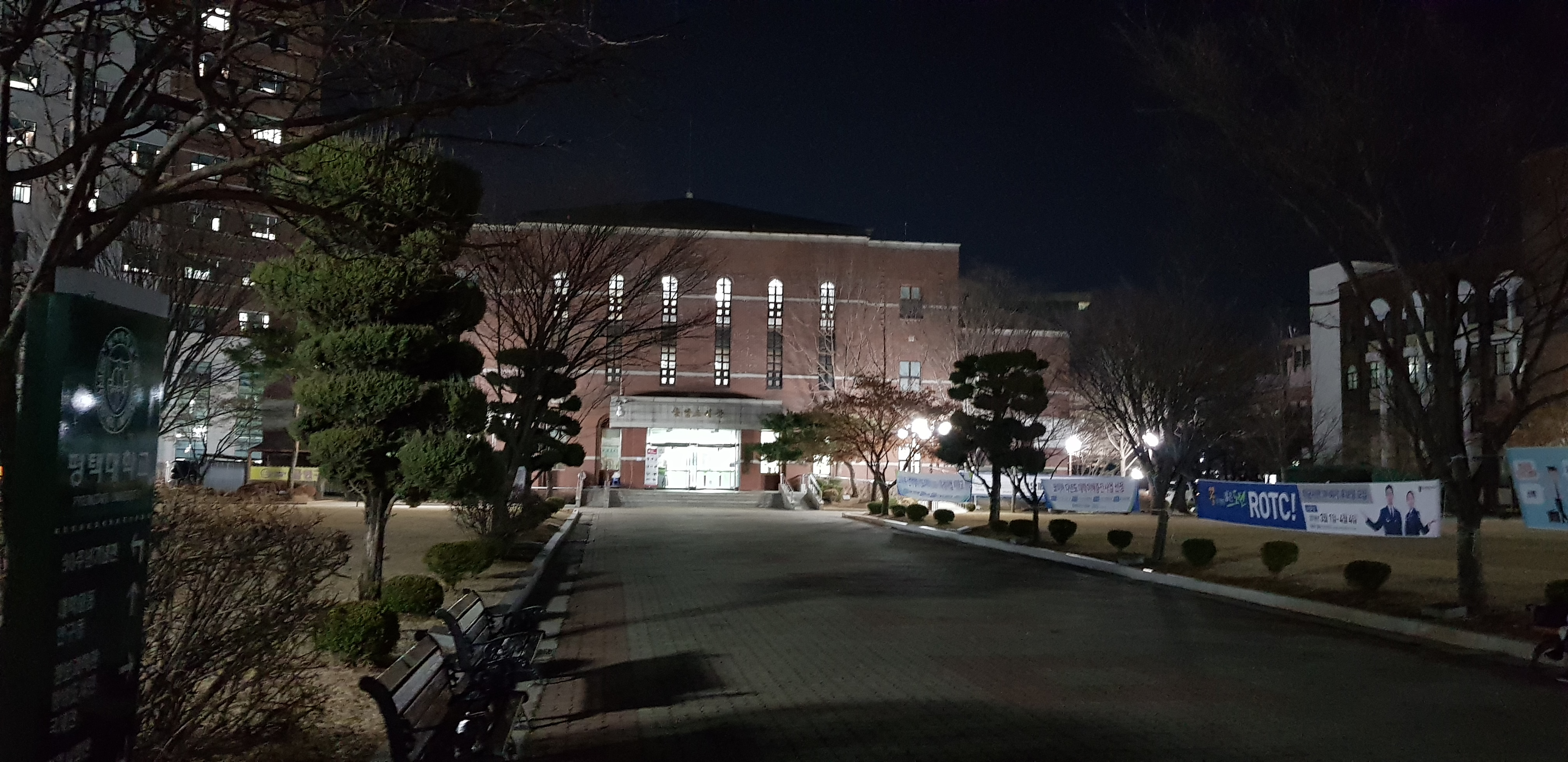
Pyeongtaek University Library

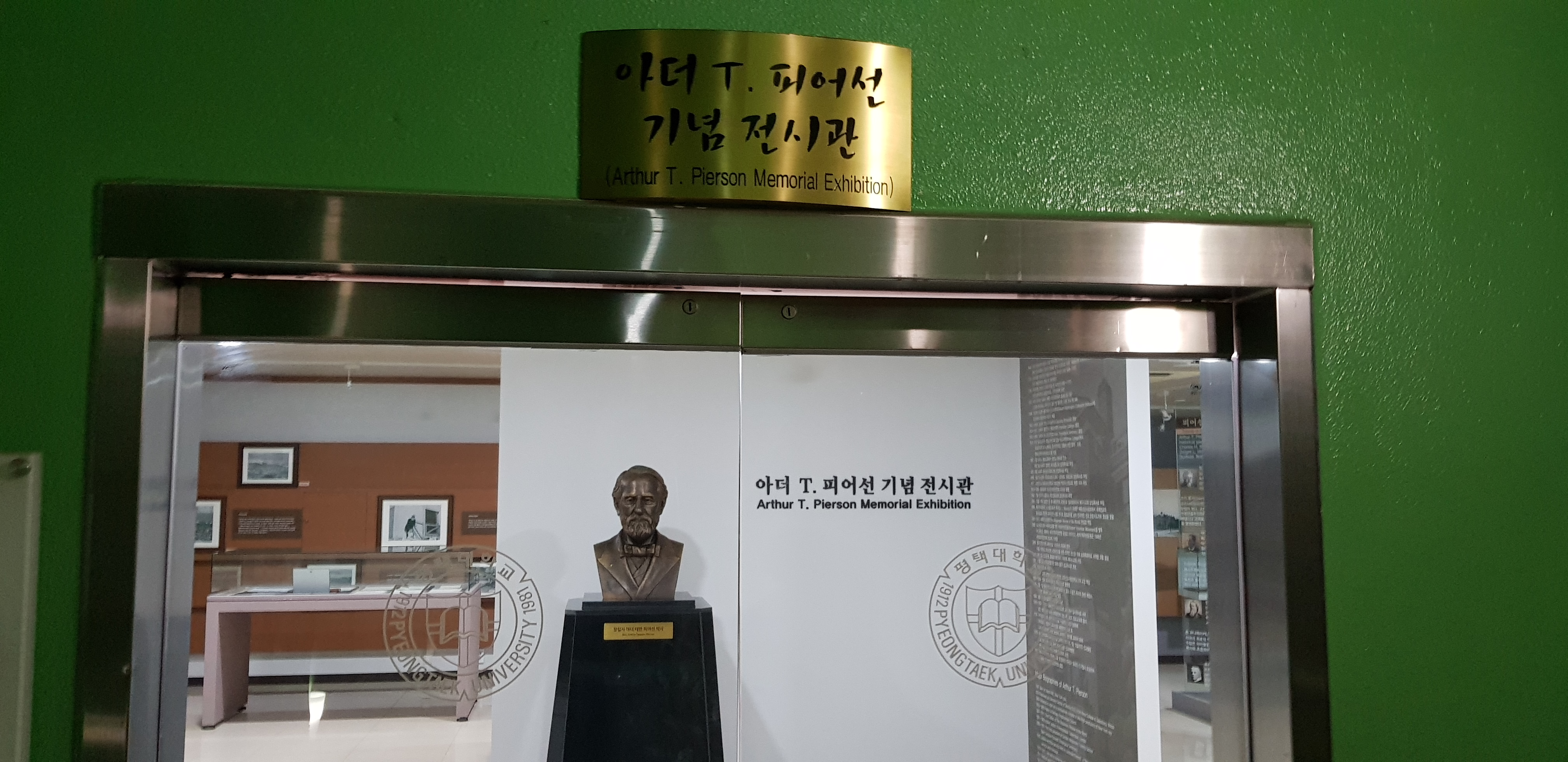
Arthur Tappan Pierson Museum

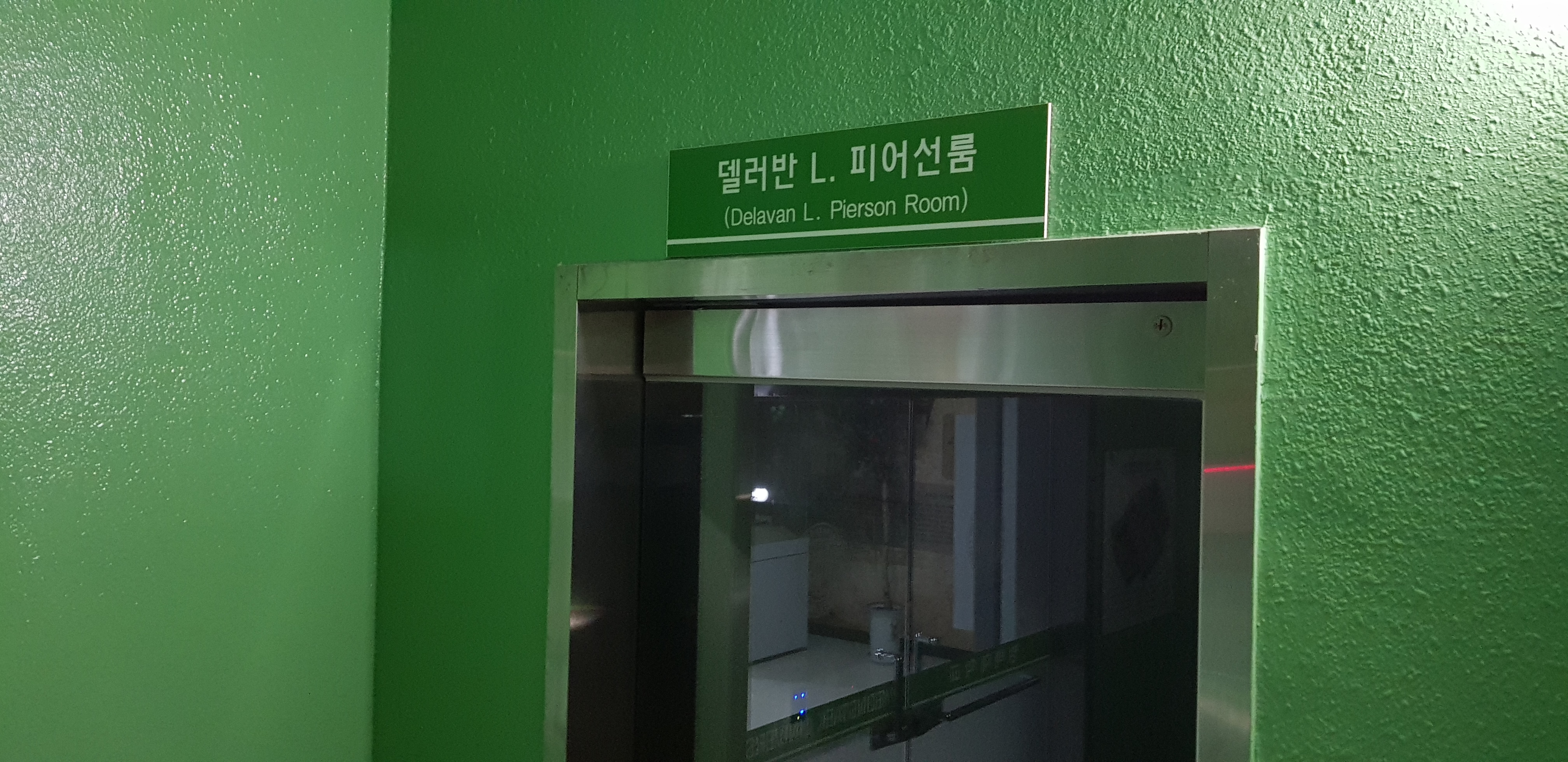
Delavan Pierson Room

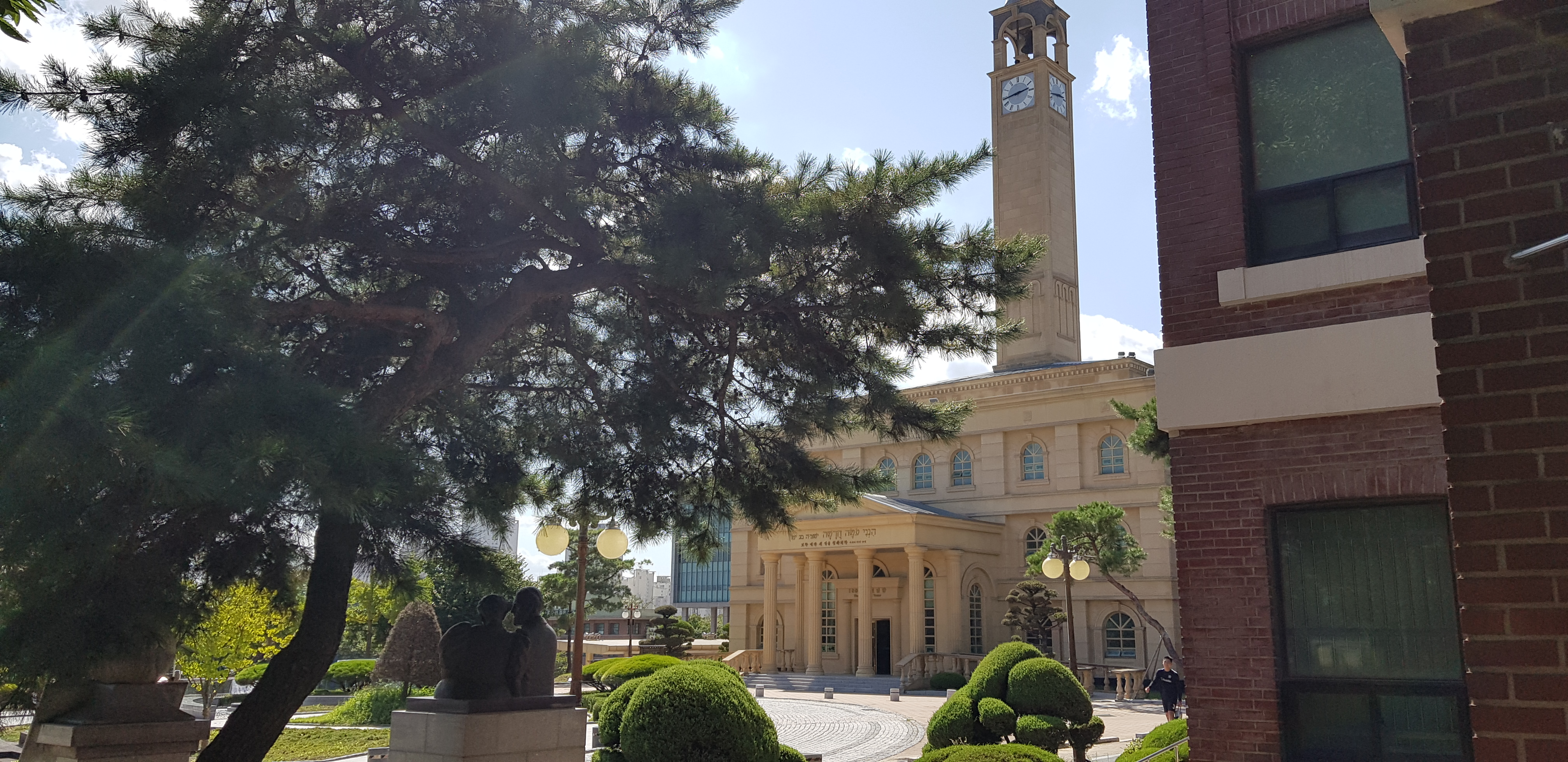
평택대학교 100주년 기념탑

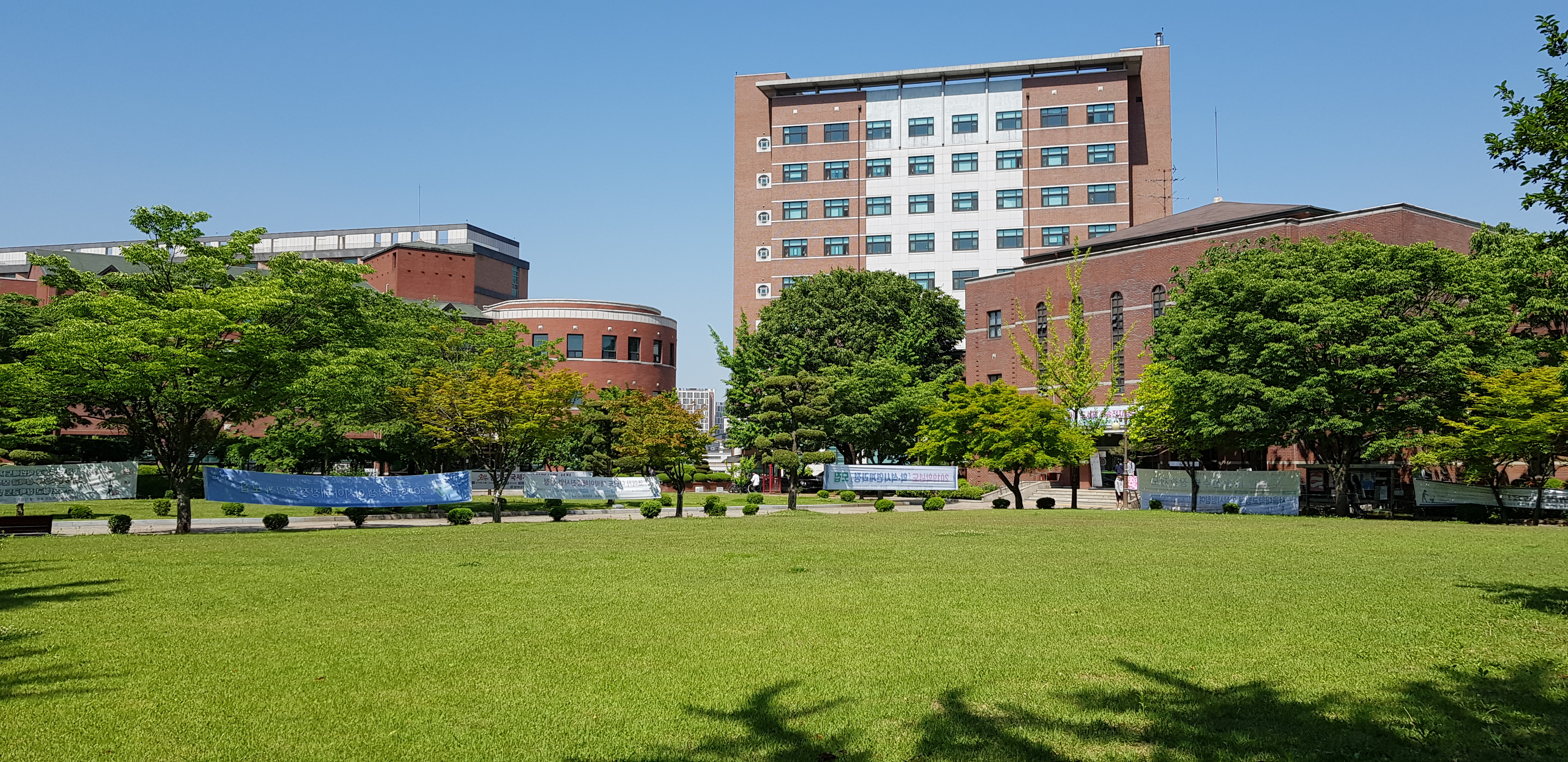
평택대학교 도서관과 기숙사 건물
