= Thomas Spurgeon =

British baptist minister (1856–1917)

The Reverend Thomas Spurgeon
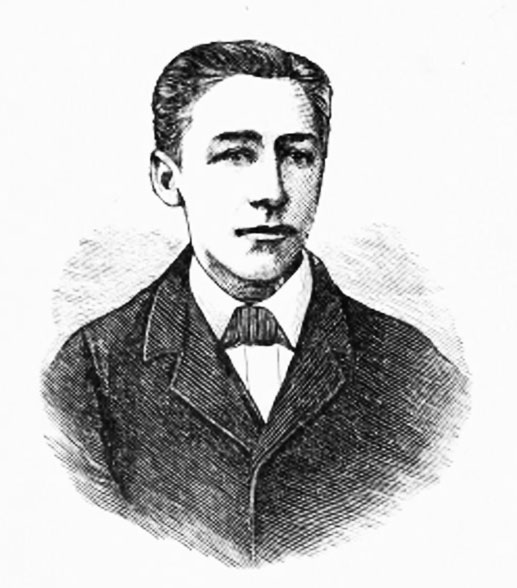
- Born: 20 September 1856; London, England
- Died: 20 October 1917 (aged 61); Streatham, London, England
- Occupation: Pastor
- Spouse: Eliza McLeod Rutherford (m. 1888)
- Children: Patrick (Pat) Spurgeon; Thomas Harold Spurgeon (1891–1967)
- Parent(s): Charles and Susannah Spurgeon

Thomas Spurgeon (20 September 1856 – 20 October 1917) was a British Reformed Baptist preacher of the Metropolitan Tabernacle, one of the fraternal twin sons of the famous Charles Spurgeon (1834–92).

== Life ==
Thomas and his twin brother were born a month before the tragedy at the Royal Surrey Gardens Music Hall of 19 October 1856 while their father was preaching. Their mother, Susannah became an invalid at the age of 33 while the boys were still in their teens.

After serving some time as an engraver, Thomas Spurgeon, like his brother Charles, decided to give his life to preaching the gospel. However, his health prevented him from remaining in England. While he was still young, he sailed to Australia, and spent one year in evangelistic labors there. After his return to England, it was decided that he must return to a better climate for his health. During the early 1880s he preached in many places in Australia, as well as in New Zealand, and finally he decided to accept the pastorate of a Baptist church in Auckland, the Auckland Baptist Tabernacle, where his influence was already becoming widely felt.

Thomas married Eliza McLeod Rutherford in 1888 in Auckland. A son, Thomas Harold Spurgeon, was born in 1891.

Thomas returned to England after the death of his father and succeeded him in his pulpit ministry after a brief period under Arthur Tappan Pierson. During Thomas' fifteen-year pastorate, the Tabernacle burned in 1898 and was rebuilt along similar lines. His brother Charles was pastor of the Greenwich Baptist Church.

He died in Streatham on 20 October 1917.

== Notes ==
Religious titles
Preceded by Arthur Tappan Pierson	Pastor of the Metropolitan Tabernacle; 1893–1908	Succeeded by Archibald G. Brown
