= Native Land Act =

Stock short title used for legislation

Native Land Act may refer to:

== Fiji ==
- Native Lands Act 1905

== New Zealand ==
- Native Lands Act 1862 (26 Victoriae 1862 No 42)
- Native Lands Act 1865 (29 Victoriae 1865 No 71)
- Native Lands Act 1866 (30 Victoriae 1866 No 28)
- Native Lands Act 1867 (31 Victoriae 1867 No 43)
- Native Land Act 1869 (32 and 33 Victoriae 1869 No 26)
- Native Land Act 1873 (37 Victoriae 1873 No 56)
- Native Land Act 1888 (52 VICT 1888 No 36)

== South Africa ==
- Natives Land Act, 1913

== Tuvalu ==
- Native Lands Act 1956 (Cap. 46.20)
