= Charles Spurgeon =

British preacher, author, pastor and evangelist (1834–1892)

The Reverend Charles Spurgeon
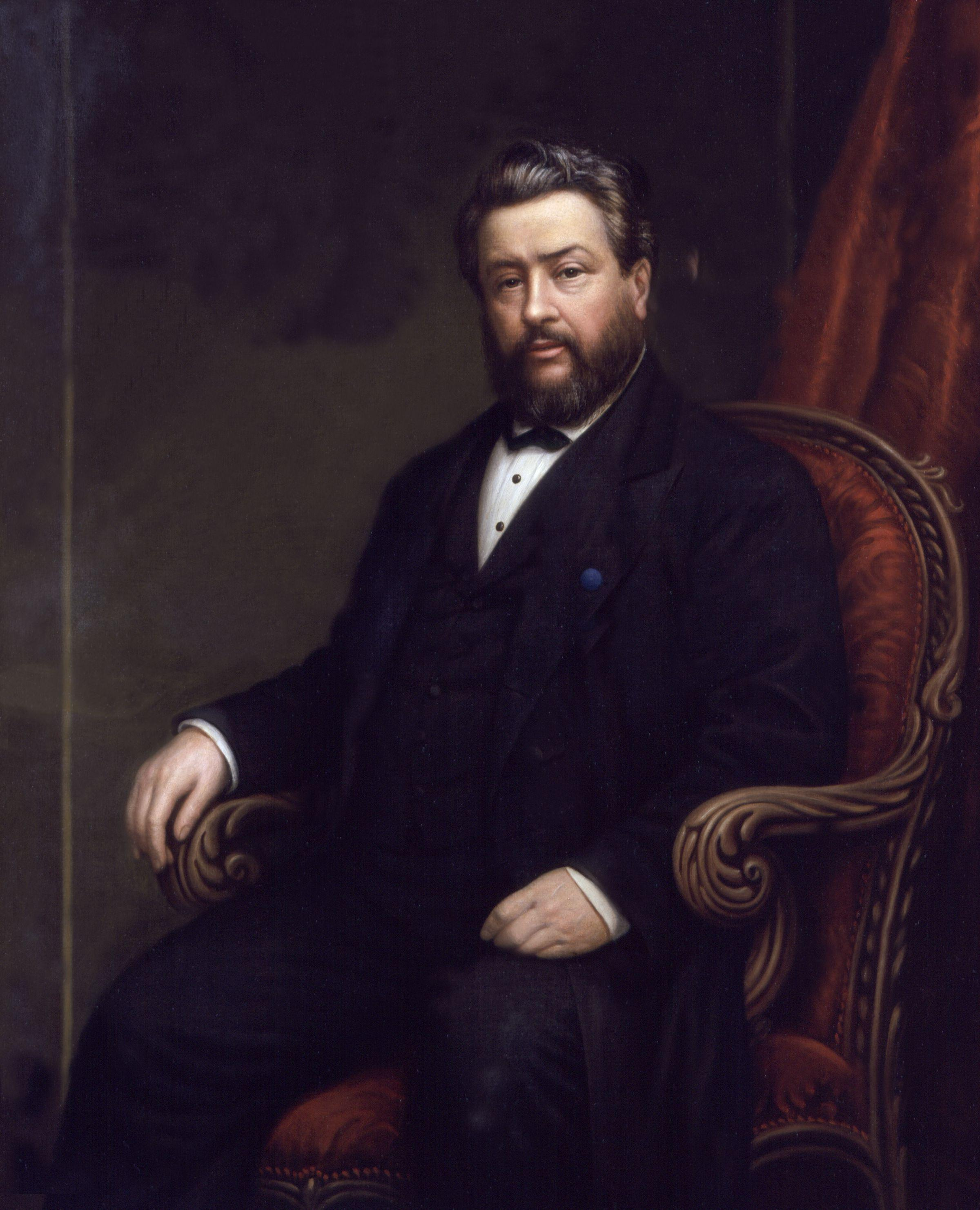
- Portrait by Alexander Melville, 1885

Personal life
- Born: Charles Haddon Spurgeon; 19 June 1834 Kelvedon, England
- Died: 31 January 1892 (aged 57) Menton, France
- Spouse: Susannah Thompson
- Children: Charles and Thomas Spurgeon (twins) (1856)
- Parent(s): John and Eliza Spurgeon
- Occupation: Pastor, author
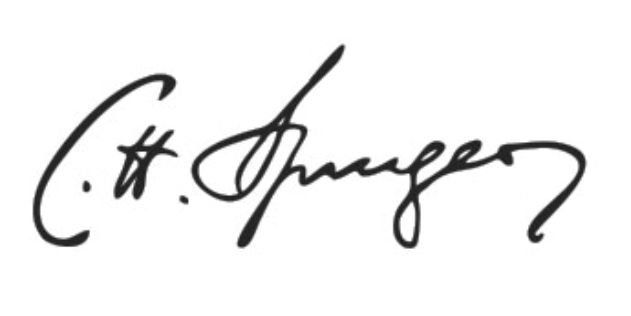
- Signature

Religious life
- Religion: Christianity
- Denomination: Particular Baptist

Charles Haddon Spurgeon (19 June 1834 – 31 January 1892) was an English Particular Baptist preacher. Spurgeon remains highly influential among Christians of various denominations, to some of whom he is known as the "Prince of Preachers." He was a strong figure in the Baptist tradition, defending the 1689 London Baptist Confession of Faith, and opposing the liberal and pragmatic theological tendencies in the Church of his day.

Spurgeon was pastor of the congregation of the New Park Street Chapel (later the Metropolitan Tabernacle) in London for 38 years. He was part of several controversies with the Baptist Union of Great Britain and later he left the denomination over doctrinal convictions.

While at the Metropolitan Tabernacle, he built an Almshouse and the Stockwell Orphanage. He encouraged his congregation to engage actively with the poor of Victorian London. He also founded Spurgeon's College, which was named after him posthumously.

Spurgeon authored sermons, an autobiography, commentaries, books on prayer, devotionals, magazines, poetry, and hymns. Many sermons were transcribed as he spoke and were translated into many languages during his lifetime. He is said to have produced powerful sermons of penetrating thought and precise exposition. His oratory skills are said to have held his listeners spellbound in the Metropolitan Tabernacle, and many Christians hold his writings in exceptionally high regard among devotional literature.

== Biography ==
=== Early life ===
Born in Kelvedon, Essex, he moved with his family to Colchester at 10 months old.

The missionary Richard Knill spent several days with Spurgeon while visiting his grandfather in 1844; he announced to him and his family that the child would one day preach the gospel to great multitudes.

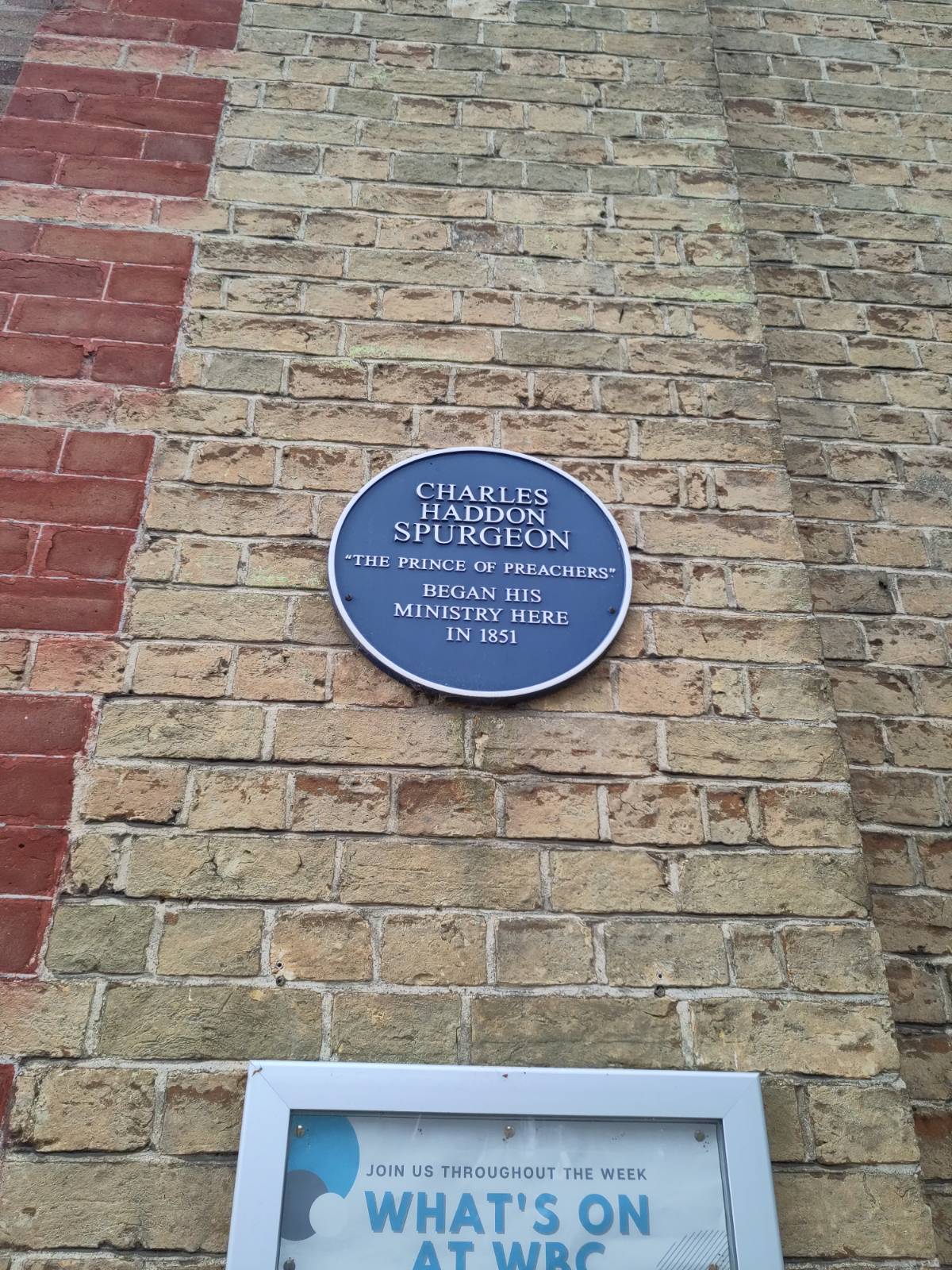
Plaque commemorating Charles Spurgeon

Spurgeon's conversion from nominal Congregationalism came on 6 January 1850, at age 15. On his way to a scheduled appointment, a snowstorm forced him to cut short his intended journey and to turn into a Primitive Methodist chapel in Artillery Street, Newtown, Colchester, where he believed God opened his heart to the salvation message. The text that moved him was Isaiah 45:22 ("Look unto me, and be ye saved, all the ends of the earth, for I am God, and there is none else"). Later that year, on April 4, he was admitted to the church at Newmarket. His baptism followed on 3 May in the river Lark, at Isleham. Later that same year he moved to Cambridge, where he later became a Sunday school teacher. Spurgeon preached his first sermon in the winter of 1850–51 in a cottage at Teversham while filling in for a friend. From the beginning of Spurgeon's ministry, his style and ability were considered to be far above average. In the same year, he was installed as pastor of the small Baptist church at Waterbeach, Cambridgeshire, where he published his first literary work, a Gospel tract written in 1853.

=== New Park Street Chapel ===
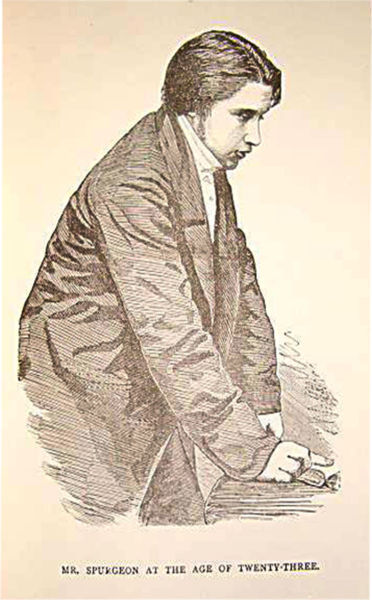
Spurgeon at age 23.

In April 1854, after preaching three months on probation and just four years after his conversion, Spurgeon, then only 19 years old, was called to the pastorate of London's famed New Park Street Chapel in Southwark (formerly pastored by the Particular Baptists Benjamin Keach, and theologian John Gill). This was the largest Baptist congregation in London at the time, although it had dwindled in numbers for several years. Spurgeon found friends in London among his fellow pastors, such as William Garrett Lewis of Westballs Grove Church, an older man who along with Spurgeon went on to found the London Baptist Association.

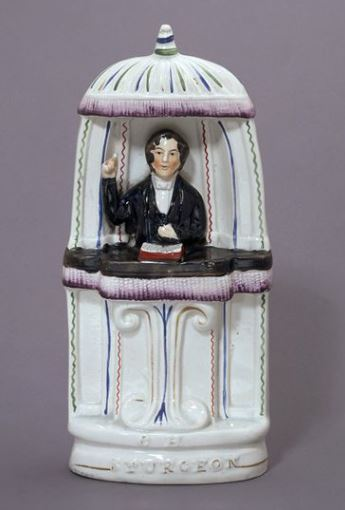
Staffordshire figurine, c. 1860

Within a few months of Spurgeon's arrival at Park Street, his ability as a preacher made him famous. The following year the first of his sermons in the "New Park Street Pulpit" was published. Spurgeon's sermons were published in printed form every week and had a high circulation. By the time of his death in 1892, he had preached nearly 3,600 sermons and published 49 volumes of commentaries, sayings, anecdotes, illustrations and devotions.

Immediately following his fame was criticism. The first attack in the press appeared in the Earthen Vessel in January 1855. His preaching, although not revolutionary in substance, was a plain-spoken and direct appeal to the people, using the Bible to provoke them to consider the teachings of Jesus Christ. Critical attacks from the media persisted throughout his life. The congregation quickly outgrew their building and moved to Exeter Hall, then to Surrey Music Hall. At 22, Spurgeon was the most popular preacher of the day.

On 8 January 1856, Spurgeon married Susannah, daughter of Robert Thompson of Falcon Square, London, by whom he had twin sons, Charles and Thomas born on September 20, 1856. At the end of that year, tragedy struck on 19 October 1856, as Spurgeon was preaching at the Surrey Gardens Music Hall for the first time. Someone in the crowd yelled, "FIRE". The ensuing panic and stampede left several dead. Spurgeon was emotionally impacted by the event and it had a sobering influence on his life. For many years he spoke of being moved to tears for no reason known to himself.

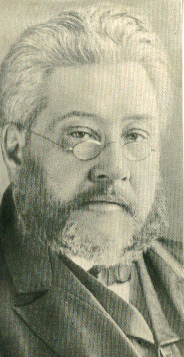
Spurgeon later in life.

Walter Thornbury later wrote in "Old and New London" (1898) describing a subsequent meeting at Surrey:

a congregation consisting of 10,000 souls, streaming into the hall, mounting the galleries, humming, buzzing, and swarming – a mighty hive of bees – eager to secure at first the best places, and, at last, any place at all. After waiting for more than half an hour – for if you wish to have a seat you must be there at least that space of time in advance… Mr. Spurgeon ascended his tribune. To the hum, rush, and trampling of men, succeeded a low, concentrated thrill and murmur of devotion, which seemed to run at once, like an electric current, through the breast of everyone present, and by this magnetic chain the preacher held us fast bound for about two hours. It is not my purpose to give a summary of his discourse. It is enough to say of his voice, that its power and volume are sufficient to reach everyone in that vast assembly; of his language that it is neither high-flown nor homely; of his style, that it is at times familiar, at times declamatory, but always happy, and often eloquent; of his doctrine, that neither the 'Calvinist' nor the 'Baptist' appears in the forefront of the battle which is waged by Mr. Spurgeon with relentless animosity, and with Gospel weapons, against irreligion, cant, hypocrisy, pride, and those secret bosom-sins which so easily beset a man in daily life; and to sum up all in a word, it is enough to say, of the man himself, that he impresses you with a perfect conviction of his sincerity.

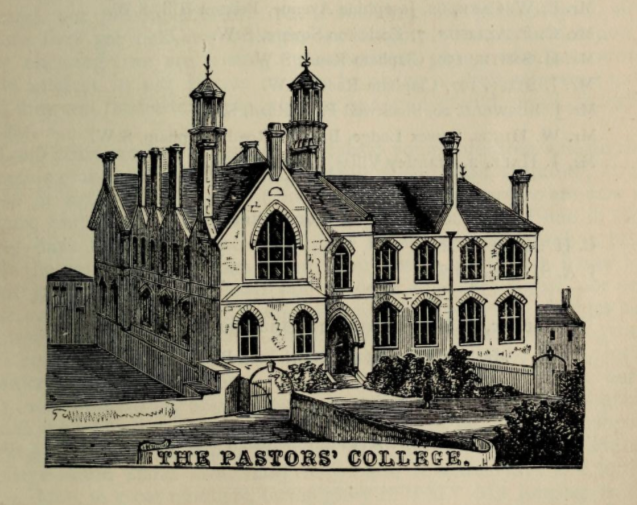
Pastors College 1888

Spurgeon's work went on. A Pastors' College was founded in 1856 by Spurgeon and was renamed Spurgeon's College in 1923, when it moved to a new building in South Norwood Hill, London. At the Fast Day, 7 October 1857, he preached to his largest crowd ever – 23,654 people – at The Crystal Palace in London. Spurgeon noted:

In 1857, a day or two before preaching at the Crystal Palace, I went to decide where the platform should be fixed; and, in order to test the acoustic properties of the building, cried in a loud voice, "Behold the Lamb of God, which taketh away the sin of the world." In one of the galleries, a workman, who knew nothing of what was being done, heard the words, and they came like a message from heaven to his soul. He was smitten with conviction on account of sin, put down his tools, went home, and there, after a season of spiritual struggling, found peace and life by beholding the Lamb of God. Years after, he told this story to one who visited him on his death-bed.

=== Metropolitan Tabernacle ===
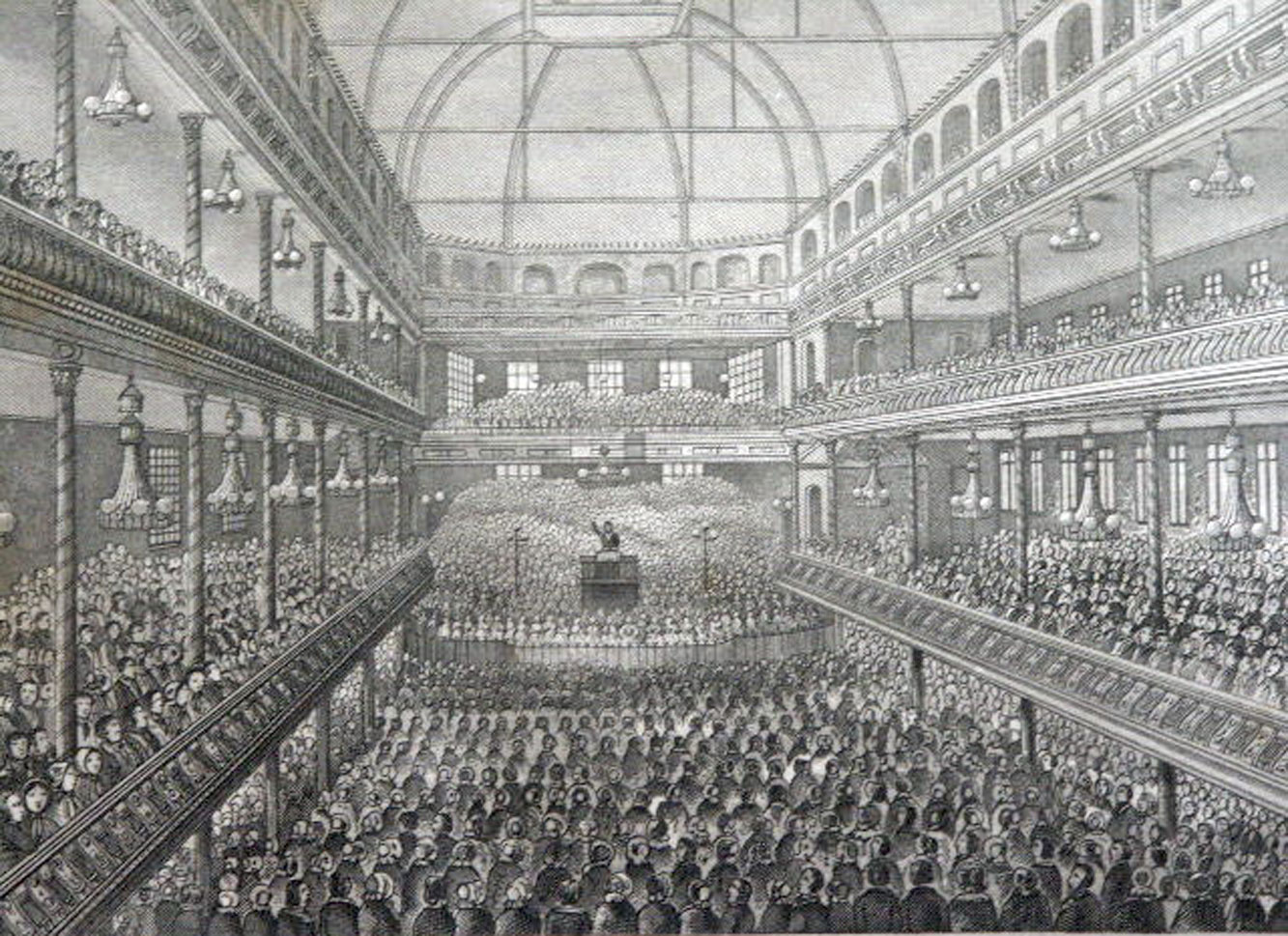
Spurgeon preaching at the Surrey Music Hall circa 1858.

On 18 March 1861, the congregation moved permanently to the newly constructed purpose-built Metropolitan Tabernacle at Elephant and Castle, Southwark, seating 5,000 people with standing room for another 1,000. The Metropolitan Tabernacle was the largest church edifice of its day. Spurgeon continued to preach there several times per week until his death 31 years later. He never gave altar calls at the conclusion of his sermons, but he always extended the invitation that if anyone was moved to seek an interest in Christ by his preaching on a Sunday, they could meet with him at his vestry on Monday morning. Without fail, there was always someone at his door the next day.

He wrote his sermons out fully before he preached, but what he carried up to the pulpit was a note card with an outline sketch. Stenographers would take down the sermon as it was delivered and Spurgeon would then have the opportunity to make revisions to the transcripts the following day for immediate publication. His weekly sermons, which sold for a penny each, were widely circulated and still remain one of the all-time best-selling series of writings published in history.

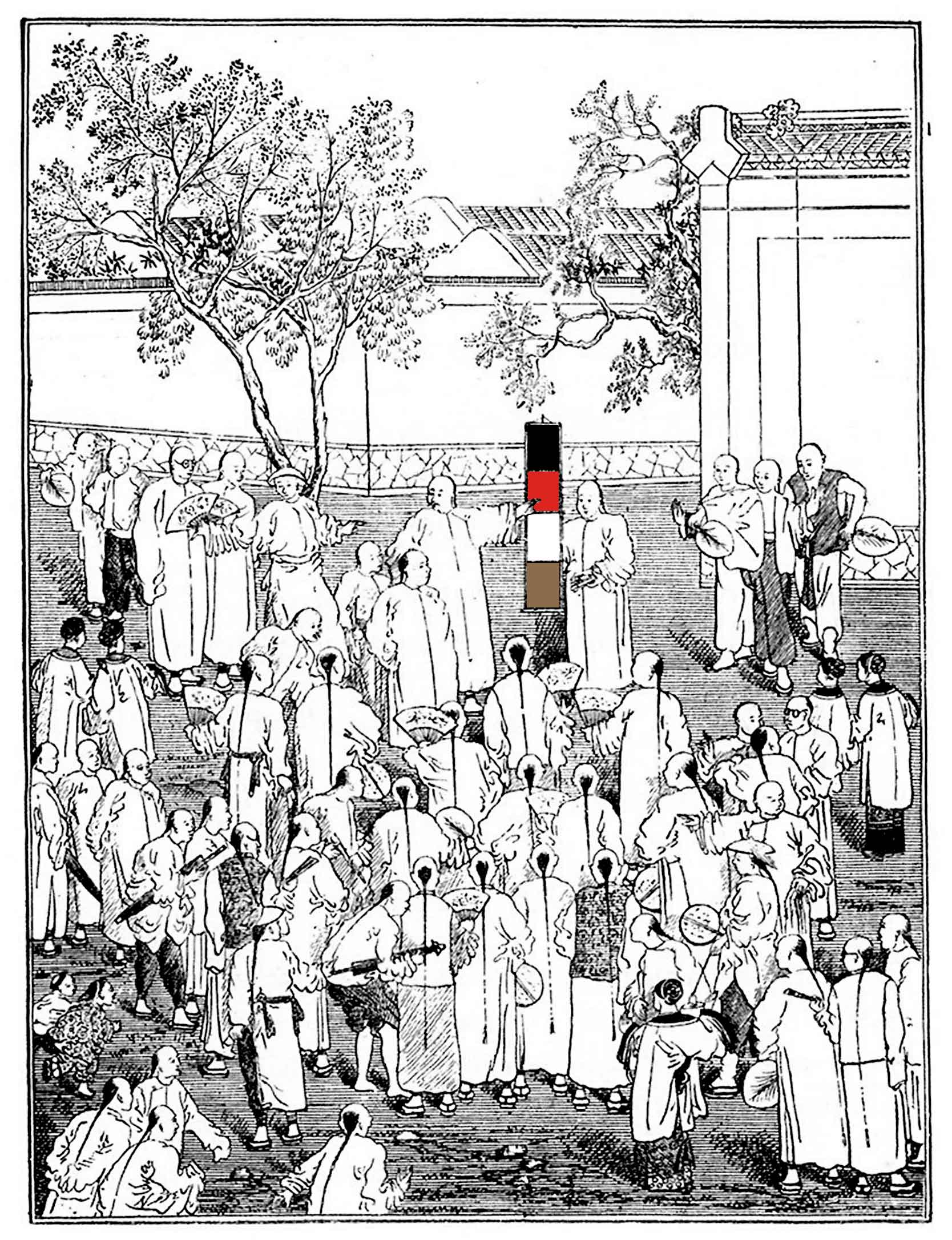
Missionary preaching in China using the Wordless Book

I would propose that the subject of the ministry of this house, as long as this platform shall stand, and as long as this house shall be frequented by worshippers, shall be the person of Jesus Christ. I am never ashamed to avow myself a Calvinist, although I claim to be rather a Calvinist according to Calvin, than after the modern debased fashion. I do not hesitate to take the name of Baptist. You have there (pointing to the baptistry) substantial evidence that I am not ashamed of that ordinance of our Lord Jesus Christ; but if I am asked to say what is my creed, I think I must reply: "It is Jesus Christ." My venerable predecessor, Dr. Gill, has left a body of divinity admirable and excellent in its way; but the body of divinity to which I would pin and bind myself for ever, God helping me, is not his system of divinity or any other human treatise, but Christ Jesus, who is the sum and substance of the gospel; who is in himself all theology, the incarnation of every precious truth, the all-glorious personal embodiment of the way, the truth, and the life. — The kernel of Spurgeon's first sermon at the Tabernacle

Besides sermons, Spurgeon also wrote several hymns and published a new collection of worship songs in 1866 called "Our Own Hymn Book".

On 5 June 1864, Spurgeon challenged the Church of England when he preached against baptismal regeneration. Spurgeon aided in the work of cross-cultural evangelism by promoting "The Wordless Book", a teaching tool that he described in a message given on 11 January 1866, regarding Psalm 51:7: "Wash me, and I shall be whiter than snow." The book has been and is still used to teach people without reading skills and people of other cultures and languages – young and old – around the globe about the Gospel message.

On the death of missionary David Livingstone in 1873, a discoloured and much-used copy of one of Spurgeon's printed sermons, on Luke 13 (the falling tower of Siloam) was found among his few possessions much later, along with the handwritten comment at the top of the first page: "Very good, D.L." He had carried it with him throughout his travels in Africa. It was sent to Spurgeon and treasured by him.

=== Metropolitan Tabernacle Societies and Institutions ===
In 1876, 22 years after becoming pastor, Spurgeon published "The Metropolitan Tabernacle: Its History and Work". His intention stated in the preface is to give a 'printed history of the Tabernacle'. The book has 15 chapters and of these 5 are given over to what he called 'Societies and Institutions'.

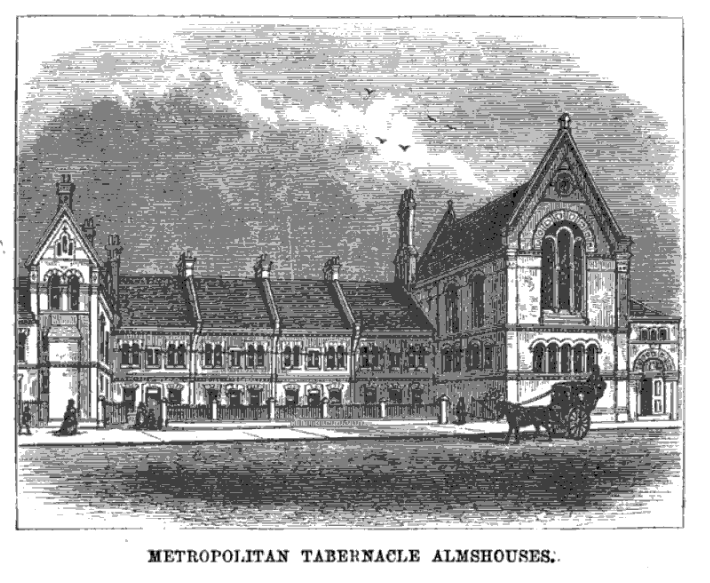
Metropolitan Tabernacle Almshouse

The Five Chapters are:

xi. The Almshouses. Explaining how the New Park Street Chapel site was sold to allow the Tabernacle to build an Almshouse and school.

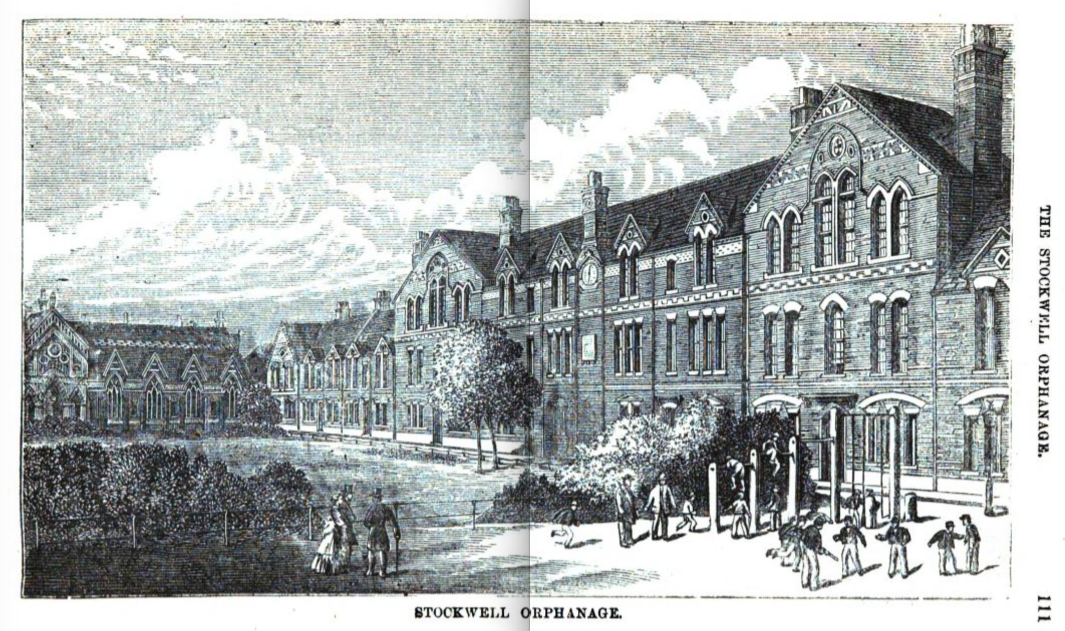
Stockwell Orphanage 1876

xiii. The Stockwell Orphanage. This opened for 240 boys in 1867 (and later for girls in 1879). These orphanages continued in London until they were bombed in the Second World War. The inspiration for starting an orphanage came from a visit with George Müller and the financial support of Anne Field Hillyard. The orphanage changed its name to Spurgeon's Child Care in 1937, and again in 2005 to Spurgeons. Spurgeon was linked more with the Stockwell orphanage than any other Metropolitan Tabernacle endeavour. There are probably four reasons for this:

1. It was a large set of buildings in London occupying four acres [1.6 hectares]. 2. There was an annual fundraiser at which Spurgeon chose to celebrate his birthday, and often the laying of a foundation stone. The event was called ‘one of the largest bazaars and fancy fairs ever held in South London’ – in one day 1,000 was raised – a lot considering entry was sixpence. Spurgeon accepted money gifts for his birthday, which all went to the orphanage. 3. The Orphanage choir and bell ringers performed concerts to fundraise 4. It had such a large operating budget compared with other Tabernacle activities.

xiv. The Colportage Association. Colporters were employed to take Bibles, good books and periodicals for sale, from house to house. They also were involved in visiting the sick and holding meetings.

xv. Other Institutions Connected with the Tabernacle. Here Spurgeon describes 21 other 'Institutions'. Two examples are: The Ordinance Poor Fund which distributed money amongst poor members of the church of about £800 annually, and the Ladies' Benevolent Society. This group made clothing for the poor and 'relieved' them, with an income of £105.

Eight years later at Spurgeon's fiftieth birthday celebration an updated list of 'Societies and Institutions' was read out. With Spurgeon's strong encouragement and support the 24 groups listed in 'The Metropolitan Tabernacle: Its History and Work', had become 69. Before they are read out Spurgeon says: "I think everybody should know what the church has been moved to do, and I beg to say that there are other societies besides those which will be mentioned, but you will be tired before you get to the end of them." and finishes after the list by saying: "We have need to praise God that he enables the church to carry on all these institutions."

He encouraged others to give, with comments like these:

On the Green Walk Mission: "Here a good hall must be built. If some generous friend would build a place for this mission, the money would be well laid out",

On colporters: "Mr Charlesworth’s two Bible classes have generously agreed to support a brother with a Bible Carriage in the streets of London. Would not some other communities of young people do well to have their own man at work in the regions where they dwell? THINK OF IT",

On the almshouses: "WE GREATLY NEED AT LEAST £5000 TO ENDOW THE ALMHOUSES, AND PLACE THE INSTITUTION UPON A PROPER FOOTING. Already C. H. Spurgeon, Thomas Olney, and Thomas Greenwood have contributed £200 each towards the fund, and we earnestly trust that either by donations or legacies the rest of the £5000 will be forthcoming."

Spurgeon had one infirmary built, at the Stockwell Orphanage. However, he also recognised that the poor had limited access to health care and so was also an enthusiastic supporter of the Metropolitan Hospital Sunday Fund. He left us this quote:

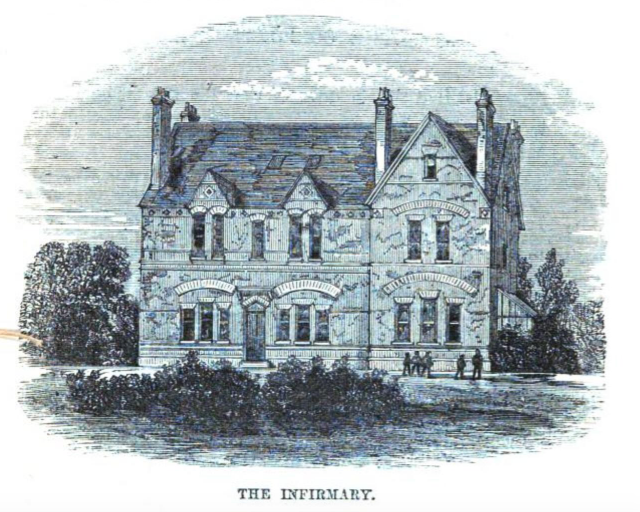
The Stockwell Orphanage Infirmary

We must have more hospitals. I do not know whether we shall not be obliged to make the Government spend something in this direction. I don’t believe in the Government doing anything well. I generally feel sorry when anything has to be left to the Government. I don’t mean this Government in particular, but any Government which may be in office for the time being. It is six of one and half-a-dozen of the other. I have a very small opinion of the whole lot. There are some things which we should try ourselves to do as long as ever we can; but if we are driven up a corner, it may come to what I fear. Bones must be set, and the sick must be cared for; the poor must not be left to die, in order not to have to go to the Government for help. So let us all try to give what we can. It is your duty to give, not merely as Christians, but as men. I like the Hospital Sunday movement, for all Christian people can meet, as we are met here to-night, on one platform.

=== Downgrade controversy ===
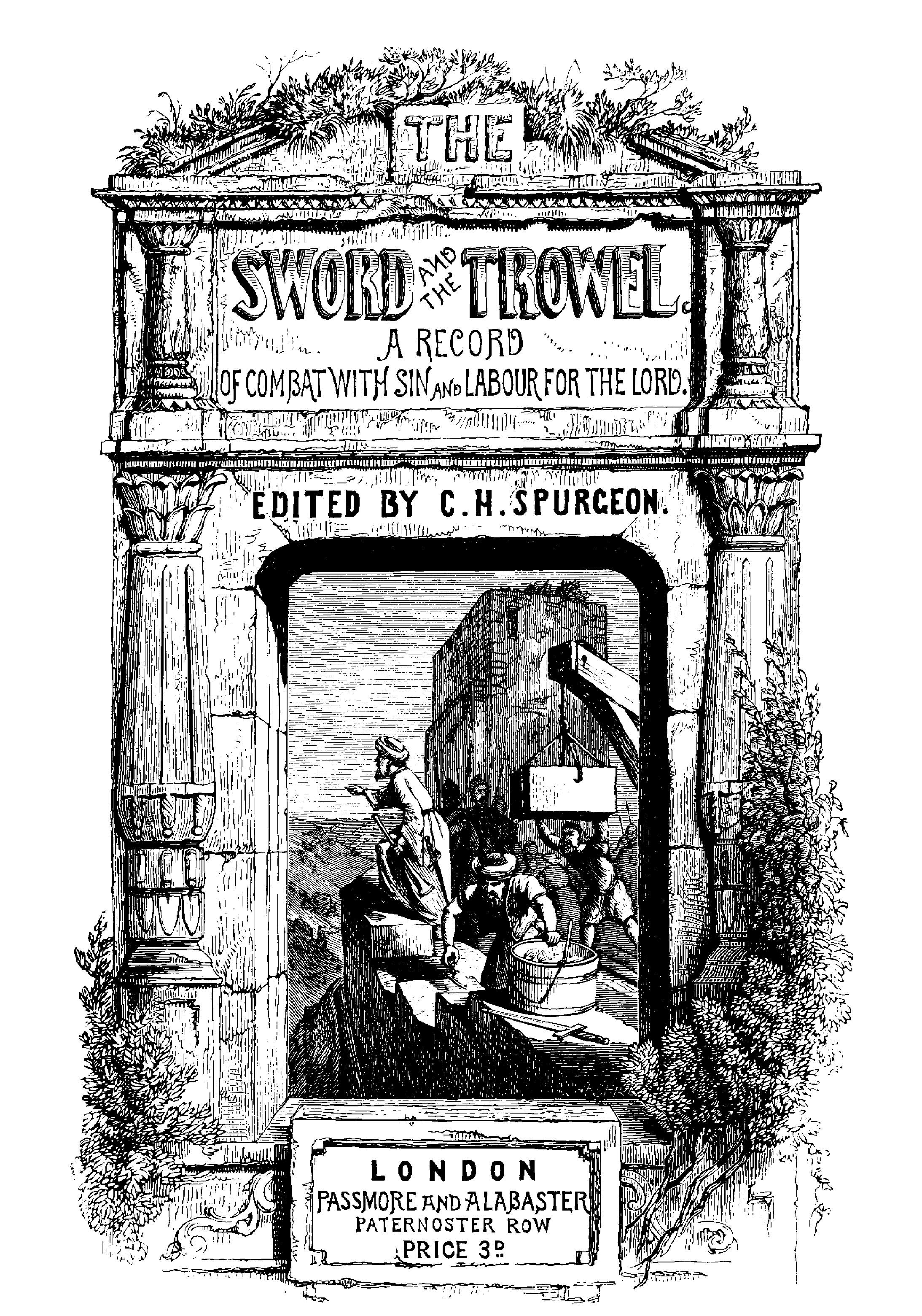
Sword and Trowel original cover page

A controversy among the Baptists flared in 1887 with Spurgeon's first "Down-grade" article, published in The Sword & the Trowel. In the ensuing "Downgrade Controversy," the Metropolitan Tabernacle disaffiliated from the Baptist Union, effectuating Spurgeon's congregation as the world's largest self-standing church. Spurgeon framed the controversy in this way:

Believers in Christ's atonement are now in declared union with those who make light of it; believers in Holy Scripture are in confederacy with those who deny plenary inspiration; those who hold evangelical doctrine are in open alliance with those who call the fall a fable, who deny the personality of the Holy Ghost, who call justification by faith immoral, and hold that there is another probation after death… It is our solemn conviction that there should be no pretence of fellowship. Fellowship with known and vital error is participation in sin.

The controversy took its name from Spurgeon's use of the term "Downgrade" to describe certain other Baptists' outlook toward the Bible (i.e., they had "downgraded" the Bible and the principle of sola scriptura). Spurgeon alleged that an incremental creeping of the Graf-Wellhausen hypothesis, Charles Darwin's theory of evolution, and other concepts were weakening the Baptist Union. Spurgeon emphatically decried the doctrine that resulted:

Assuredly the New Theology can do no good towards God or man; it, has no adaptation for it. If it were preached for a thousand years by all the most earnest men of the school, it would never renew a soul, nor overcome pride in a single human heart.

The standoff caused division amongst the Baptists and other non-conformists and is regarded by many as an important paradigm. (Note: An accessible analysis, sympathetic to Spurgeon but no less useful, of the Downgrade Controversy appears at Tec Malta.)

=== Opposition to slavery ===
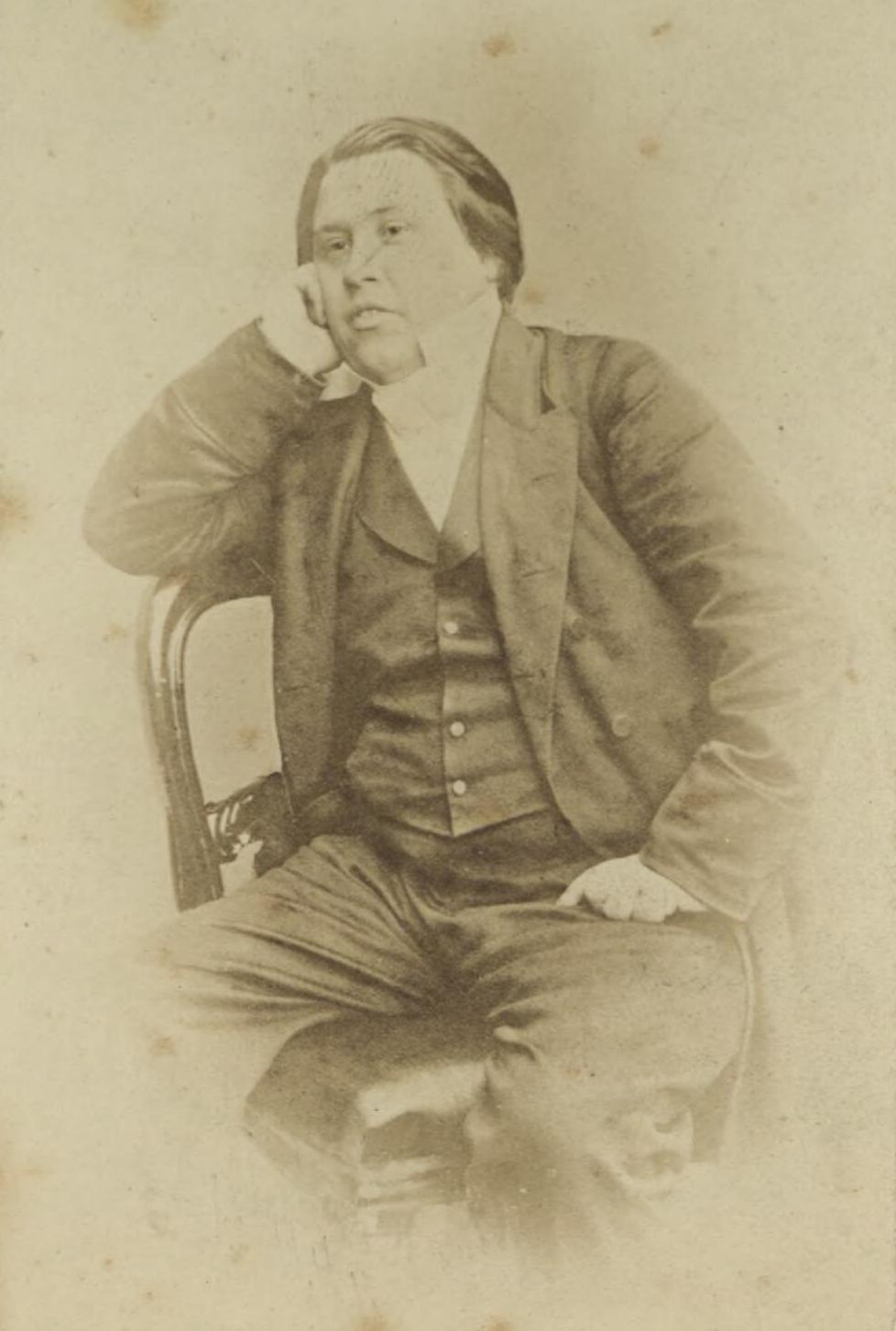
Photograph of Spurgeon c.1870

Spurgeon strongly opposed the owning of slaves. He lost support from the Southern Baptists, sales of his sermons dropped, and he received scores of threatening and insulting letters as a consequence.

Not so very long ago our nation tolerated slavery in our colonies. Philanthropists endeavored to destroy slavery; but when was it utterly abolished? It was when (William) Wilberforce roused the church of God, and when the church of God addressed herself to the conflict, then she tore the evil thing to pieces. I have been amused with what Wilberforce said the day after they passed the Act of Emancipation. He merrily said to a friend when it was all done, "Is there not something else we can abolish?" That was said playfully, but it shows the spirit of the church of God. She lives in conflict and victory; her mission is to destroy everything that is bad in the land. The Best Warcry, March 4, 1883.

In a letter to the Christian Watchman and Reflector (Boston), Spurgeon declared:

I do from my inmost soul detest slavery… and although I commune at the Lord's table with men of all creeds, yet with a slave-holder I have no fellowship of any sort or kind. Whenever [a slave-holder] has called upon me, I have considered it my duty to express my detestation of his wickedness, and I would as soon think of receiving a murderer into my church… as a man stealer.

=== Restorationism ===
Like other Baptists of his time, despite opposing Dispensationalism, Spurgeon anticipated the restoration of the Jews to inhabit the Promised Land.

We look forward, then, for these two things. I am not going to theorize upon which of them will come first – whether they shall be restored first, and converted afterwards – or converted first and then restored. They are to be restored and they are to be converted, too. The Restoration And Conversion of the Jews. Ezekiel 37.1–10, June 16th, 1864

=== Final years and death ===
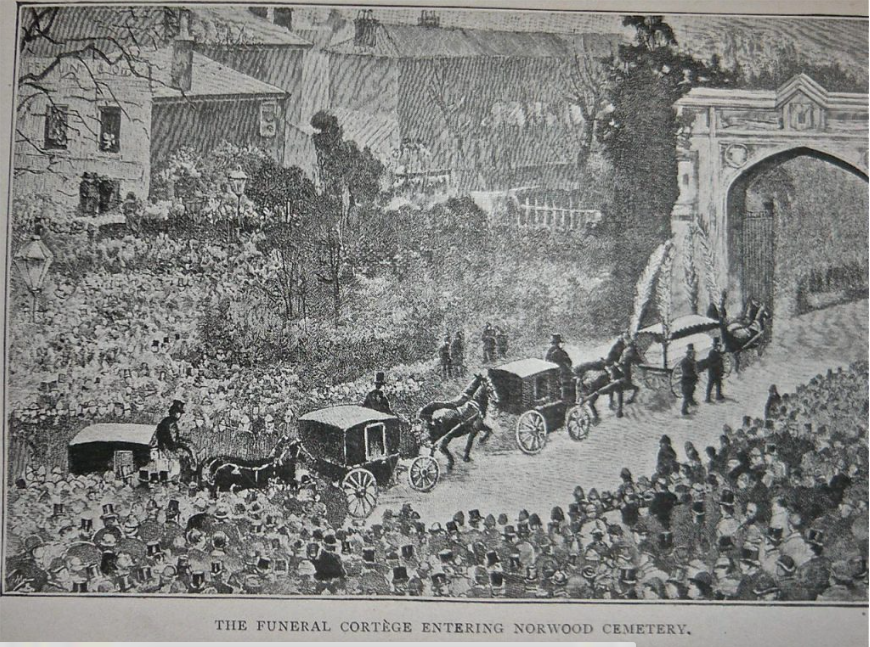
Spurgeon's funeral cortege

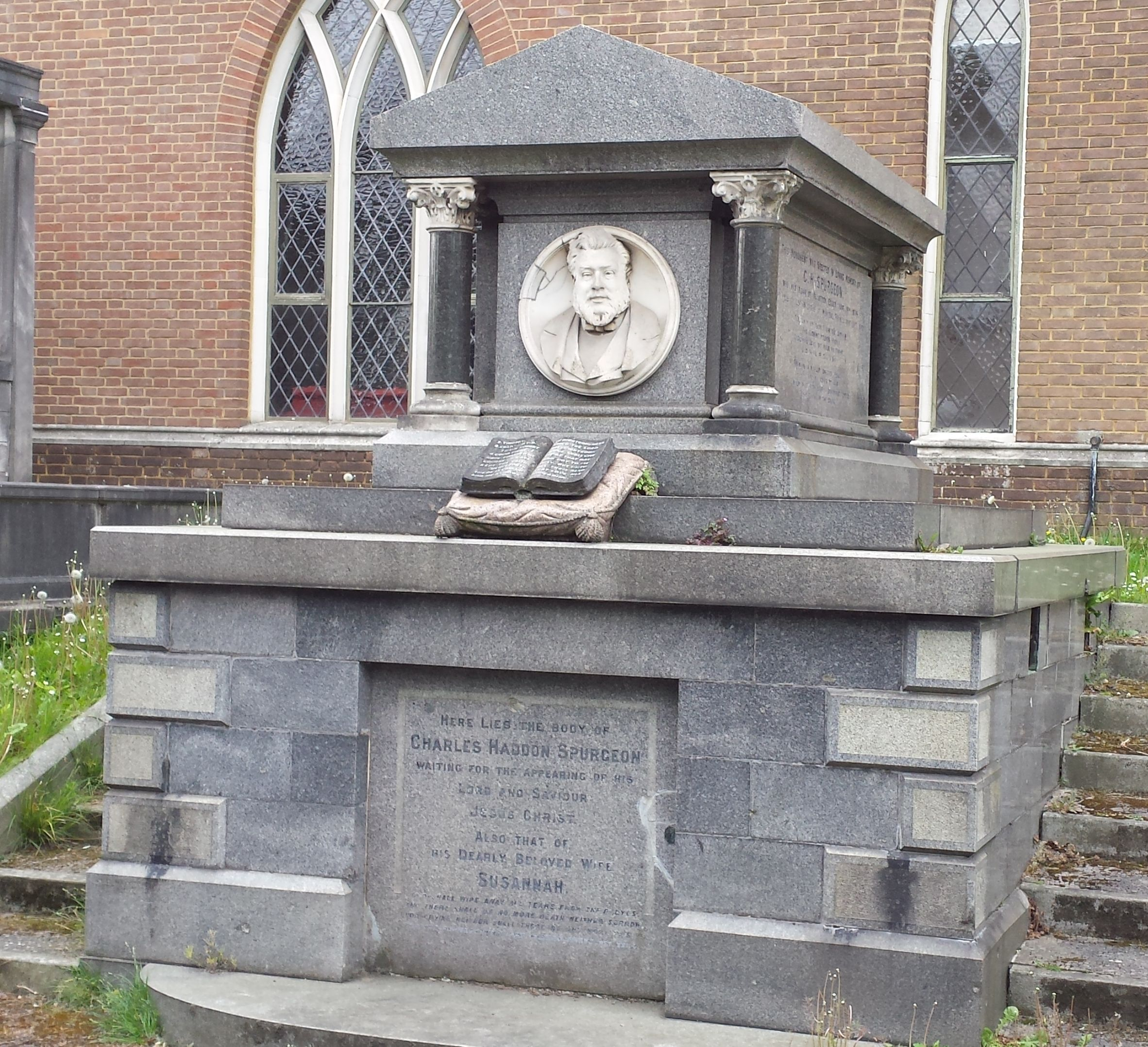
Tomb of Charles Spurgeon, West Norwood Cemetery, London

Spurgeon's wife was often too ill to leave home to hear him preach.

Spurgeon also had a long history of poor health. He was already being reported as having gout when he was 33.

It was true, he said, that he had had the gout, and a very horrible pain it was; but he had had the gout in his left leg, and he had preached standing on the other. He had not had the gout in his tongue, and he was not aware that people preached with their legs.

By 1871, when he was 37 he was already being advised by his doctors to leave town for his health.

His favourite place to go to rest was Menton in the South of France. He was often there in the winter months. He was there often enough to have visitors, with George Müller visiting in 1879 and members of the Baptist Union in 1887, attempting to get him to rejoin the Union.

When he was well enough in Menton he would preach in the local church, or write, such as in 1890 when he wrote a commentary on Matthew while ‘resting’.

He became increasingly unwell and in May 1891 he was forced 'to rest'. In 1891 he went to rest in Menton and remained there for three months. During this period he wrote 180 pages of commentary. However, he did not recover and died at the age of 57, while still in Menton, from gout and congestion of the kidneys. From May 1891 until his death in January 1892, he received 10,000 letters of 'condolence, resolutions of sympathy, telegrams of enquiry'.

After Spurgeon's body was returned to England it lay in repose in the Metropolitan Tabernacle.

Two days prior to the funeral, four memorial services were held at the Metropolitan Tabernacle. The first service at 11 am was for those with current communion cards, the second at 3 pm was for ministers and student pastors, the third at 7 pm was for Christians who hadn't gotten in yet and the final service at 11 pm included the Stockwell Orphans. Police controlled the crowds waiting to get in during the day, and to help with order, at the end of services people left through a back door.

On the day of the funeral, eight hundred extra police were on duty along the route the cortège took, from the Metropolitan Tabernacle, past the Stockwell Orphanage and to the Norwood Cemetery. Accounts vary about the number of carriages in the cortege. One account puts it as:

Sixty-five pair-horse broughams were provided by the undertakers for conveying the invited mourners and delegates to the cemetery, but there were altogether from two to three hundred private carriages and other vehicles joining in the procession, which it is estimated must have been nearly two miles in length

Extra trains were put on to cater for the crowd, along with extra omnibuses and cabs. Except for a few tobacco shops and taverns, the businesses along the funeral route were shut, with some houses displaying black and white material. An estimated total of 100,000 people either passed by Spurgeon as he lay in state or attended the funeral services. An unknown number lined the streets for the cortége. As the cortége passed the Stockwell Orphanage it stopped briefly while the children sang a verse of one of his favourite hymns “For ever with the Lord,” with the refrain “Nearer home.”. Along the route, some flags were at half-mast.

Spurgeon was survived by his wife and sons. His remains were buried at West Norwood Cemetery in London, where the tomb is still visited by admirers. His son Tom became the pastor of the Metropolitan Tabernacle after his father died.

== Library ==
William Jewell College in Liberty, Missouri, purchased Spurgeon's 5,103-volume library collection for £500 ($2500) in 1906. The collection was purchased by Midwestern Baptist Theological Seminary in Kansas City, Missouri, in 2006 for $400,000 and can be seen on display at the Spurgeon Library on the campus of Midwestern Seminary. A special collection of Spurgeon's handwritten sermon notes and galley proofs from 1879 to 1891 resides at Samford University in Birmingham, Alabama.

Spurgeon's College in London also has a small number of notes and proofs. In July 2025, the college trustees announced the immediate closure of the college owing to financial constraints.

Spurgeon's personal Bible, with his handwritten notes, is on display in the library of the Southern Baptist Theological Seminary in Louisville, Kentucky.

== Works ==
- 2200 Quotations from the Writings of Charles H. Spurgeon
- A Good Start: A Book for Young Men and Women
- Able to the Uttermost
- According to Promise
- All of Grace : ISBN 1-60206-436-9
- An All-Round Ministry
- Around the Wicket Gate
- Barbed Arrows for the Quiver
- C.H. Spurgeon's Autobiography : ISBN 0-85151-076-0
- Christ's Incarnation: "Good Tidings of Great Joy"
- Come Ye Children
- Commenting and Commentaries
- Eccentric Preachers
- Faith (1856, republished in 1903 as Faith: What It Is and What It Leads To)
- Feathers For Arrows
- Flashes of Thought: 1000 Choice Extr. From the Works of C.H. Spurgeon
- Gleanings Among the Sheaves
- God Promises You : ISBN 0-88368-459-4
- Home Worship and the Use of the Bible in the Home
- John Ploughman's Pictures
- John Ploughman's Talk
- Lectures to My Students : ISBN 0-310-32911-6
- Metropolitan Tabernacle Pulpit
- Miracles and Parables of Our Lord
- Morning and Evening : ISBN 1-84550-014-8
- Only a Prayer Meeting
- Our Own Hymn-book: A Collection of Psalms and Hymns for Public, Social, and Private Worship
- Pictures from Pilgrim's Progress
- Sermons in Candles
- Sermons for Special Days and Occasions
- Smooth Stones Taken from Ancient Brooks: Being a Collection of Sentences, Illustrations, and Quaint Sayings, from the Works of that Renowned Puritan : ISBN 978-1-84871-113-6
- Soul Winner, The : ISBN 1-60206-770-8
- Speeches ... at Home and Abroad
- Spurgeon's Commentary on Great Chapters of the Bible
- Spurgeon's Sermon Notes : ISBN 0-8254-3768-7
- Talks to Farmers
- The Cheque Book of the Bank of Faith : ISBN 1-85792-221-2
- The Dawn of Revival (Prayer Speedily Answered)
- The Down Grade Controversy
- The Greatest Fight in the World
- The Interpreter, or Scripture for Family Worship
- The New Park Street Pulpit
- The Power of Prayer in a Believer's Life : ISBN 0-88368-441-1
- The Preachers Power and the Conditions of Obtaining It
- The Saint and His Saviour
- The Salt Cellars
- The Sword and The Trowel
- The Treasury of David : ISBN 0-8254-3683-4
- The Two Wesleys: On John and Charles Wesley : ISBN 978-1498205313
- The Wordless Book
- Till He Come
- We Endeavor: Helpful Words For Members of the Young People's Society of Christian Endeavor
- Words of Cheer for Daily Life: One of the rarest works, printed in 1898 with only three copies printed, and barely referenced in history. One reference can be found in the-annual-American-catalogue 1898 "Cheer for Life" Rare work Referenced
- Word and Spirit : ISBN 0-85234-545-3
- Words of Advice to Seekers
- Words of Counsel: For All Leaders, Teachers, and Evangelists
- Words of Wisdom for Daily Life

Spurgeon's works have been translated into many languages and Moon's and Braille type for the blind. He also wrote many volumes of commentaries and other types of literature.

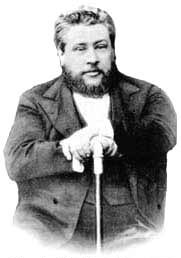
Spurgeon near the end of his life.

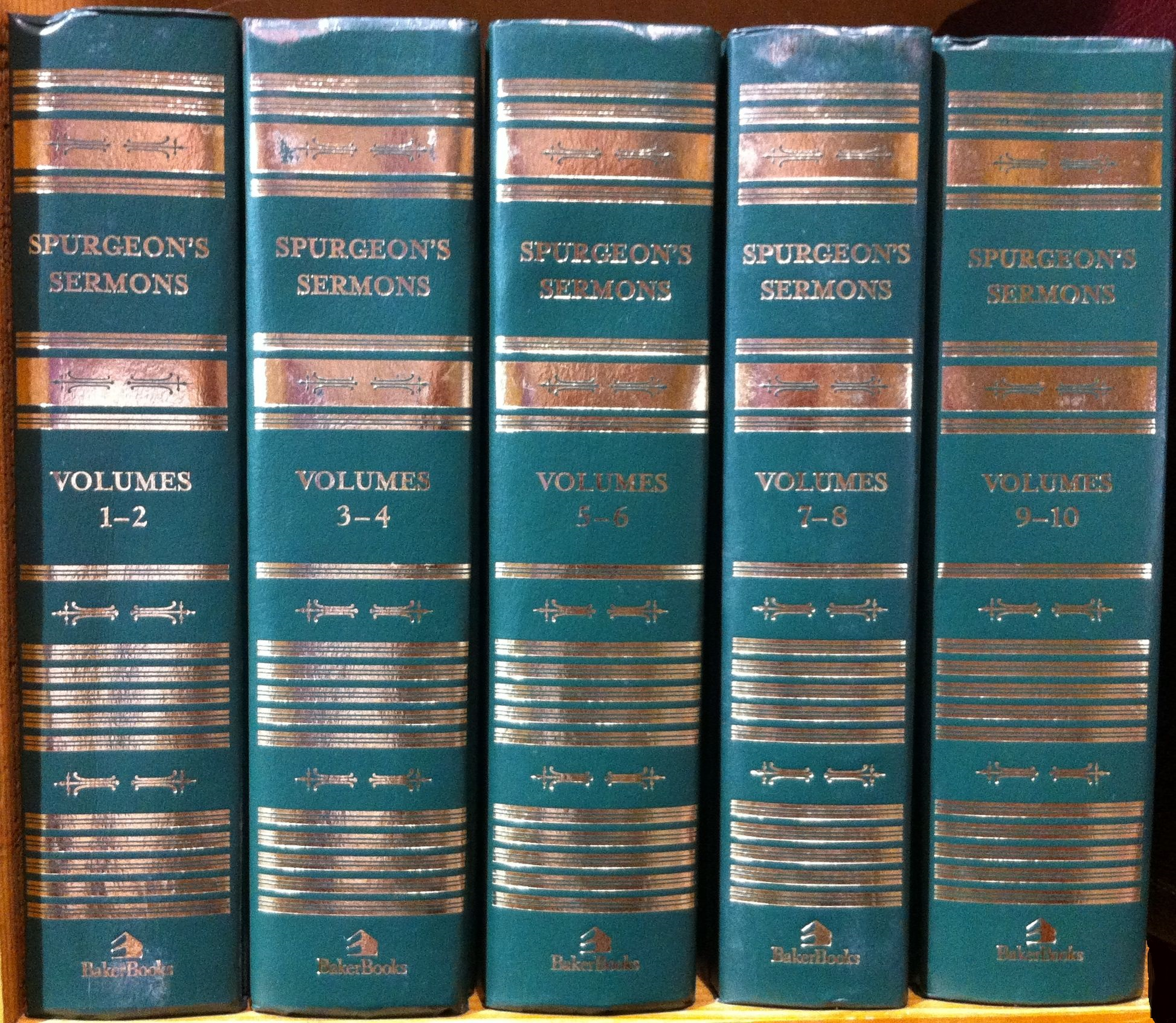
A five-volume set of Spurgeon's sermons

== Notes ==
Religious titles
Preceded by William Walters	Pastor of the Metropolitan Tabernacle; 1854–1892	Succeeded by Arthur Tappan Pierson
