= List of principals of Regent's Park College, Oxford =

The head of Regent's Park College, a permanent private hall of the University of Oxford is called the principal. This list also includes the heads of the predecessor institutions of the college, Baptist College, Stepney and Regent's Park College, London.

== Principals of Baptist College, Stepney ==
- 1810–1826 William Newman
- 1826–1827 Solomon Young
- 1827–43 William Harris Murch
- 1843–47 Benjamin Davies
- 1847–49 William D. Jones
- 1849–1856 Joseph Angus

== Principals of Regent's Park College, London ==
- 1856–1893 Joseph Angus
- 1896–1920 George Pearce Gould
- 1920–1927 H. Wheeler Robinson

== Principals of Regent's Park College, Oxford ==
- 1927–1942 H. Wheeler Robinson
- 1942–1958 Robert Child
- 1958–1972 Gwynne Henton Davies
- 1972–1989 Barrington (Barrie) Raymond White
- 1989–2007 Paul Fiddes
- 2007–2021 Robert Ellis
- From 2023 Sir Malcolm Evans
