= Regent's Park College Boat Club =

British rowing club

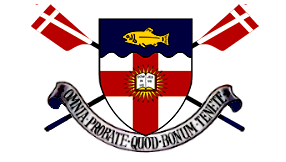

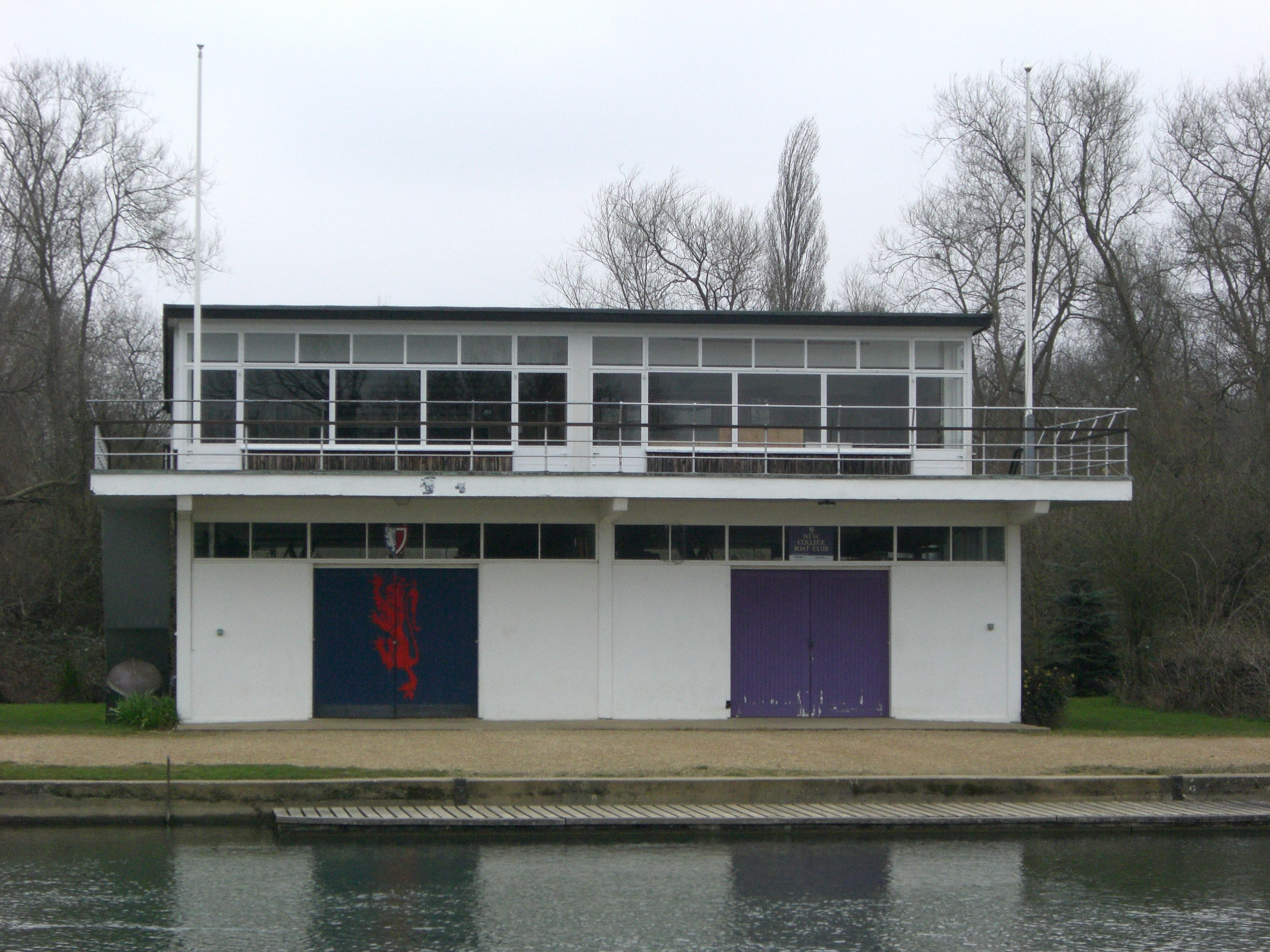

- Regent's Boathouse (right, shared with New College) and rowing blade colours
- Home water: River Thames (known in Oxford as the Isis)
- Founded: 1969
- Key people: Sam Seaborn (President) Tina Macaulay (Treasurer) Kyle Kirkpatrick (Men's Captain) Emily Meixner (Women's Captain) Minori Kojima-Morgan (Captain of Coxes) Jeffrey Chan (Social Secretary)
- University: University of Oxford
- Colours
- Affiliations: British Rowing (boat code RPC)
- Website: regentsjcr.com/boatclub

Regent's Park College Boat Club (RPCBC) is the boat club of Regent's Park College, Oxford, a permanent private hall of the University of Oxford. It is based in New College Boat House which it shares with New College Boat Club. The club also represents the female rowers of Blackfriars Hall.

The club was established shortly after Regent's Park became a permanent private hall of the university in 1957 and currently owns two boats, one named "Regent's Shark", in which the men's team row, and a more-lightweight women's eight named 'Bond Girls.' The club competes in a number of inter-collegiate races in both the male and the female categories including the Torpids and Eights Week. It is governed by a committee of students, who are all elected in Trinity Term, while the executive committee consists of a President, Treasurer, and the men's and women's captains, along with the senior member.

== History ==
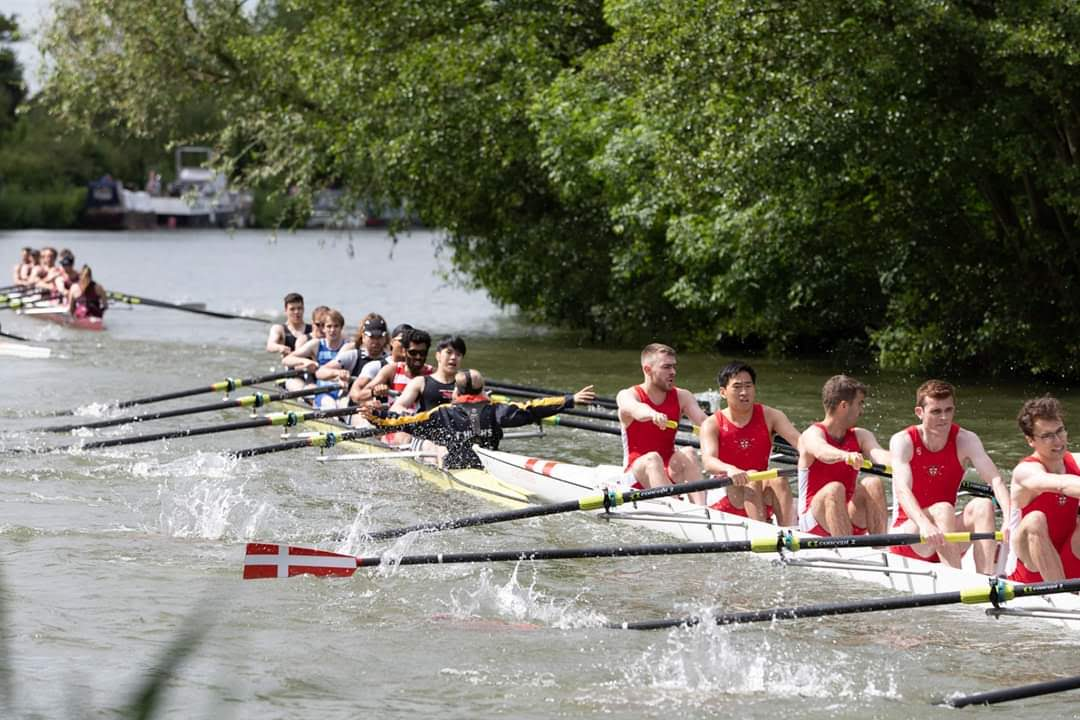
Regent's Park Men's VIII bump Magdalen's II VIII on the third day of Summer Eights 2019

The boat club has competed in most Torpids and eights competitions throughout its history and occasionally puts out a boat for the Christ Church Regatta. In 2014, the women's novice boat that entered the Christ Church Regatta proceeded to win the overall competition – among the biggest achievements for any Regent's Park sports team in history. Both the men's and women's boat have won blades on a number of occasions and in 1979 the boat club undertook a charity row from Oxford back to the college's origins in Regent's Park, London, which was filmed by the BBC for a special documentary.

In 2005, a joint Regent's Park-LMH women's crew took part in the Oxford-Cambridge Channel Challenge, setting a new record for a women's crew rowing across the English Channel.

Between 2005 and 2010, the Men's VIII established a record of thirty-four consecutive starts in a bumps race without being bumped once itself. The Men's VIII has currently gone sixteen days of racing, or four years, without being bumped in the Summer Eights competition (as well as nine days in Torpids), the third-best record of crews currently on the water.

Double blades (blades in Torpids and Eights in the same year) have been achieved three times in boat club history – by the Men's crews of 1979 and 2006, and the Women's crews of 2015 and 2016.

After a sustained period of success, both the men's and women's boats are in historically high positions: the men are at their highest position since 1982 in Torpids and their highest ever position in Summer Eights, while the women's winning of Trophy Blades in the 2019 Summer Eights propelled them to their highest position since 2000.

In 2022, Gabrielle Smith became the club's first representative in The Boat Race.

Unfortunately due primarily to poor weather, the men's boat club destroyed two boats in 2024 and won spoons.

== Traditions ==
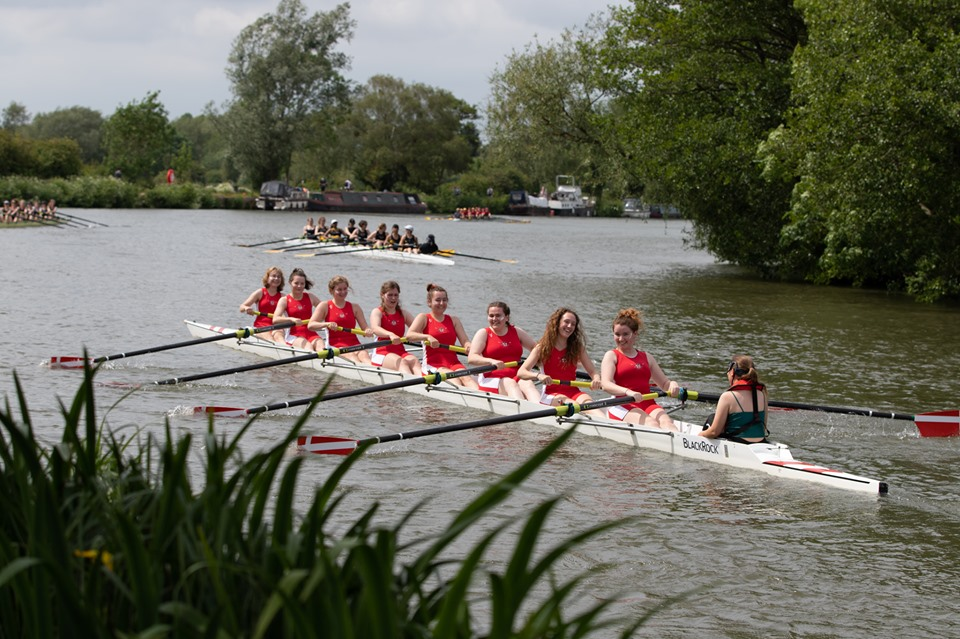
Regent's Park Women's VIII in 2019

Members of the club who have rowed in at least one university race (and, usually, who have won trophy blades in that race) are entitled to wear the boat club blazer, especially at the college's annual Final Fling ball. Club members who have competed in at least one race (but not won trophy blades) are entitled to wear the boat club tie.

On the final day of each regatta, the Men's and Women's crews all down a small Smirnoff ice or non-alcoholic alternative.

== Honours ==
=== Boat Race representatives ===
The following rowers were part of the rowing club at the time of their participation in The Boat Race.

Women's boat race

Year	Name
2022	Gabrielle Smith

=== Summer Eights Blades (since 1980) ===
- Men: 1986, 1993, 1994, 1995, 2000, 2006
- Women: 1994, 2007, 2015, 2016, 2019

=== Torpids Blades (since 1980) ===
- Men: 1991, 2006, 2012
- Women: 2013, 2015, 2016
