= Michael Ward (scholar) =

English literary critic and Catholic priest (born 1968)

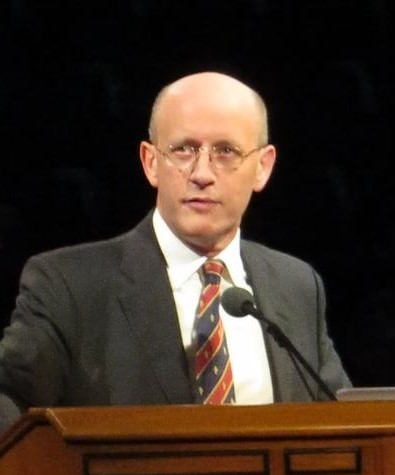
Michael Ward speaking in 2017.

Michael Ward (born 6 January 1968) is an English literary critic, theologian and Catholic priest. His academic focus is theological imagination, especially in the writings of C. S. Lewis, J. R. R. Tolkien, and G. K. Chesterton. He is best known for his book Planet Narnia, in which he argues that Lewis structured The Chronicles of Narnia so as to embody and express the imagery of the seven heavens. On the fiftieth anniversary of Lewis's death, Ward unveiled a permanent national memorial to him in Poets' Corner, Westminster Abbey. He won a Mythopoeic Award in 2011.

== Career ==
Ward was born in Cuckfield, West Sussex. He studied at Regent's Park College, Oxford, Peterhouse, Cambridge, and the University of St Andrews. He is currently an Associate Member of the Faculty of Theology and Religion at the University of Oxford, and Professor of Apologetics at Houston Christian University. He was Senior Research Fellow at Blackfriars Hall, University of Oxford (2012-2021).

Ward trained for the Anglican ministry at Ridley Hall, Cambridge, and was ordained a priest in the Church of England in 2005. He served as Chaplain of Peterhouse, Cambridge (2004-2007) and Chaplain of St Peter's College, Oxford (2009-2012). He joined the Catholic Church in 2012, and was ordained a priest within the Personal Ordinariate of Our Lady of Walsingham in June 2018.

Ward played the part of C. S. Lewis's vicar in the 2021 film The Most Reluctant Convert. He has been an extra in a number of films and television dramas, including a speaking role in A Very Open Prison and a featured cameo in The World Is Not Enough. In 2023, he co-authored Popcorn with the Pope: A Guide to the Vatican Film List with David Paul Baird and Andrew Petiprin, which reviews all forty-five films on a list compiled under the pontificate of Pope John Paul II to mark the centenary of cinema.

== Bibliography ==
=== Books ===
- After Humanity: A Guide to C. S. Lewis's The Abolition of Man, Word on Fire Academic, 2021. ISBN 978-1943243778
- Planet Narnia: The Seven Heavens in the Imagination of C. S. Lewis, Oxford University Press, 2008. ISBN 978-0-199-73870-0
- Popcorn with the Pope: A Guide to the Vatican Film List (co-authored with David Paul Baird and Andrew Petiprin), Word on Fire, 2023. ISBN 978-1-68578-984-8
- C. S. Lewis at Poets' Corner (edited with Peter S. Williams), Wipf & Stock, 2016. ISBN 978-0-718-89485-6
- The Cambridge Companion to C. S. Lewis (edited with Robert MacSwain), Cambridge University Press, 2010. ISBN 978-0-521-71114-2
- Heresies and How to Avoid Them: Why it Matters What Christians Believe (edited with Ben Quash), Hendrickson, 2007. ISBN 978-0-281-05843-3

=== Essays ===
- "An Experiment in Charity: C. S. Lewis on Love in the Literary Arts" in The Inklings and Culture (ed. Monika B. Hilder et al), Cambridge Scholars Publishing, 2020. ISBN 978-0190214340
- "Afterword: A Brief History of the Oxford C. S. Lewis Society" in C. S. Lewis and His Circle: Essays and Memoirs from the Oxford C. S. Lewis Society (ed. Roger White, Judith Wolfe, and Brendan N. Wolfe), Oxford University Press, 2015. ISBN 978-0190214340
- "The Tragedy is in the Pity: C. S. Lewis and the Song of the Goat" in Christian Theology and Tragedy (eds. T. Kevin Taylor and Giles Waller), Ashgate, 2012. ISBN 978-0-7546-6940-1
- "The Good Serves the Better and Both the Best: C. S. Lewis on Imagination and Reason in Apologetics" in Imaginative Apologetics: Theology, Philosophy and the Catholic Tradition (ed. Andrew Davison), SCM Press, 2011. ISBN 978-0-8010-3981-2
- "C. S. Lewis" in The Heart of Faith: Following Christ in the Church of England (ed. Andrew Atherstone), Lutterworth, 2008. ISBN 978-07188-3072-4
- "Christianity and Film" in Christ and Culture in Dialogue (ed. Angus Menuge), Concordia Academic Press, 1999. ISBN 978-0-570-04273-0
