= Malcolm Evans (academic lawyer) =

English legal scholar, born 1959

Sir Malcolm Evans KCMG OBE FLSW
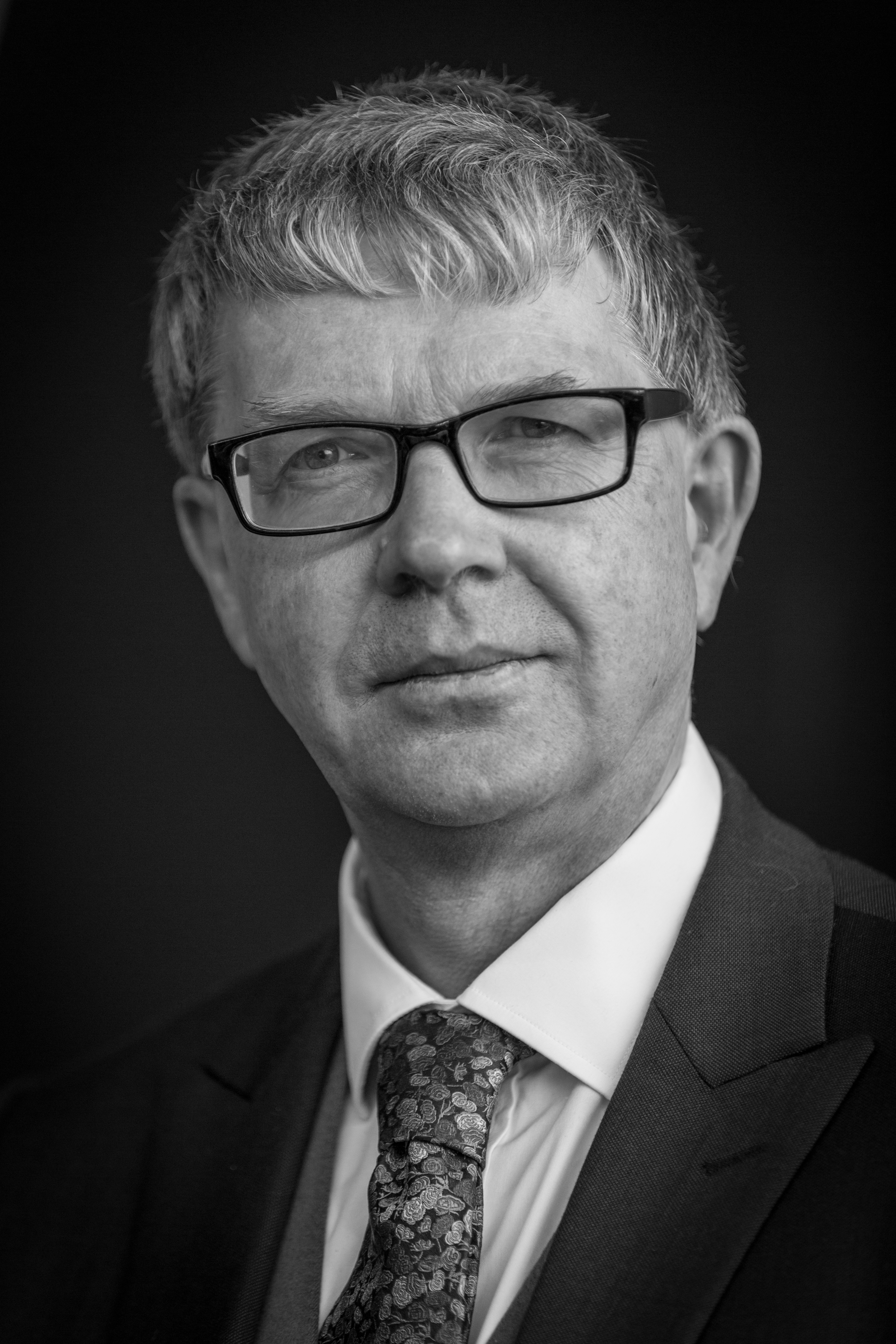
- Malcolm Evans (2015)

Principal of Regent's Park College, Oxford
- Incumbent
- Assumed office 2023
- Preceded by: Robert Ellis

Personal details
- Born: 1959 (age 66–67)
- Spouse: Revd. Dr. Allison Evans
- Education: Regent's Park College, Oxford; University of Bristol
- Profession: English legal scholar
- Awards: Knight Commander of the Order of St Michael and St George; Officer of the Order of the British Empire; Hon Doctorate Bangor University

Academic work
- Discipline: Law
- Institutions: University of Bristol

Sir Malcolm David Evans, KCMG, OBE, FLSW (born 1959) is an English legal scholar. Since 2023, he has been principal of Regent's Park College, Oxford.

== Biography ==
Until 2023 Evans was Professor of Public International Law at the University of Bristol. He has worked extensively on human rights issues for numerous international bodies and NGOs. His research interests include the law of the sea and the international protection of human rights, with particular focus on the freedom of religion (for which he was knighted in 2015) and the prevention of torture.

He studied law at Regent's Park College, Oxford (1979–82 and 1983–87) for undergraduate and then for a DPhil. He was appointed to a lectureship at the University of Bristol in 1988 and in 1999 was appointed Professor of Public International Law. He was Head of the School of Law 2003-05 before becoming Dean of the Faculty of Social Sciences and Law. In 2012 he was awarded an honorary fellowship by Bangor University Law School.

He is a member of the Organization for Security and Co-operation in Europe Advisory Panel on Freedom of Religion and Belief; the International Law Association Human Rights Law and Practice Committee; and the Board of Management of the Association for the Prevention of Torture. Among his many roles, Sir Malcolm has served as a member and, from 2011-2020 Evans chair of the United Nations Subcommittee for the Prevention of Torture. In 2015 Evans was appointed as a member of the reconstituted panel of the Independent Inquiry into Child Sexual Abuse. He was appointed Knight Commander of the Order of St Michael and St George (KCMG) in the 2016 New Year Honours for services to torture prevention and religious freedom.

In 2020, he was elected a Fellow of the Learned Society of Wales. In June 2022, he was named as the new Principal of his former Permanent Private Hall Regent's Park College, Oxford. Evans is the first Principal not to have been an ordained Baptist minister.

In 2025, Evans gave the University Sermon at University Church of St Mary the Virgin. He is currently chair of the academic board for the college's GIC+ Project, aiming to explore religious leadership and LGBTQ+ rights, led by Prof Dr Freya Baetens. He is also on the editorial board for the Oxford Journal of Law and Religion.

Evans was elected a Titular Member (Membre titulaire) of the Institute of International Law (Institut de Droit International) at its 2025 Session in Rabat, Morocco.

== Works ==
=== Research Projects ===
==== Evaluation of the effectiveness of the national institutions under the optional protocol to the UN Convention on torture ====
From June 2006 to June 2009 Professor Rachel Murray held a high profile AHRC funded project which examined the implementation of the Optional Protocol to the UN Convention against Torture. Professor Malcolm Evans was the joint grant holderThe culmination of the project was the publication of the book The Optional Protocol to the UN Convention Against Torture by the Oxford University Press. Over the three years of the project, there were some 150 interviews conducted with individuals from national governments, NHRIs, national NGOs and civil society organisations of nearly 30 countries. All the world regions were covered, selecting countries that have ratified OPCAT and already had established or were in the process of establishing their NPMs.

=== Books ===
- Evans, Malcolm D. (1989). Relevant Circumstances and Maritime Delimitation. Oxford: Clarendon Press. ISBN 978-0-198-25240-5.
- ——— (1997). Religious Liberty and International Law in Europe. Cambridge Studies in International and Comparative Law. Cambridge: Cambridge University Press. ISBN 978-0-521-55021-5.
- ———; Morgan, Rod (1998). Preventing Torture: A Study of the European Convention for the Prevention of Torture. Oxford: Oxford University Press. ISBN 978-0-198-26257-2.
- ———; Morgan, Rod (2001). Combating Torture in Europe. Council of Europe Press. ISBN 978-9-2871-4614-4.
- ——— (2008). Manual on the Wearing of Religious Symbols in Public Areas. Council of Europe & Martinus Nijhoff. ISBN 978-9-2871-6616-6.
