= Roger Jones =

Roger Jones may refer to:

- Roger Jones (footballer, born 1902) (1902–1967), English football wing-half
- Roger Jones (footballer, born 1946), English football goalkeeper
- Roger Jones (American football) (born 1969), American football player
- Roger Jones (mathematician), American mathematician
- Roger Jones (composer) (born 1948), British composer and musician
- Roger Jones, 1st Viscount Ranelagh (before 1589–1643), member of the Peerage of Ireland and lord president of Connaught
- Roger Jones (MP) (c. 1691–1741), British Member of Parliament for Brecon
- Roger Jones (adjutant general) (1789–1852), Adjutant General of the U.S. Army from 1825 to 1852
- Roger Jones (inspector general) (1831–1889), Inspector General of the U.S. Army from 1888 to 1889 (son of the above)
- Roger Jones (poet) (born 1954), American poet
- Roger Jones (pharmacist) (1943–2026), British businessman
- Roger Jones (physician) (born 1948), British general practitioner
- Roger W. Jones (1908–1993), U.S. government official
- Roger Jones (bowls), Welsh lawn bowler
