= Roger Jones (composer) =

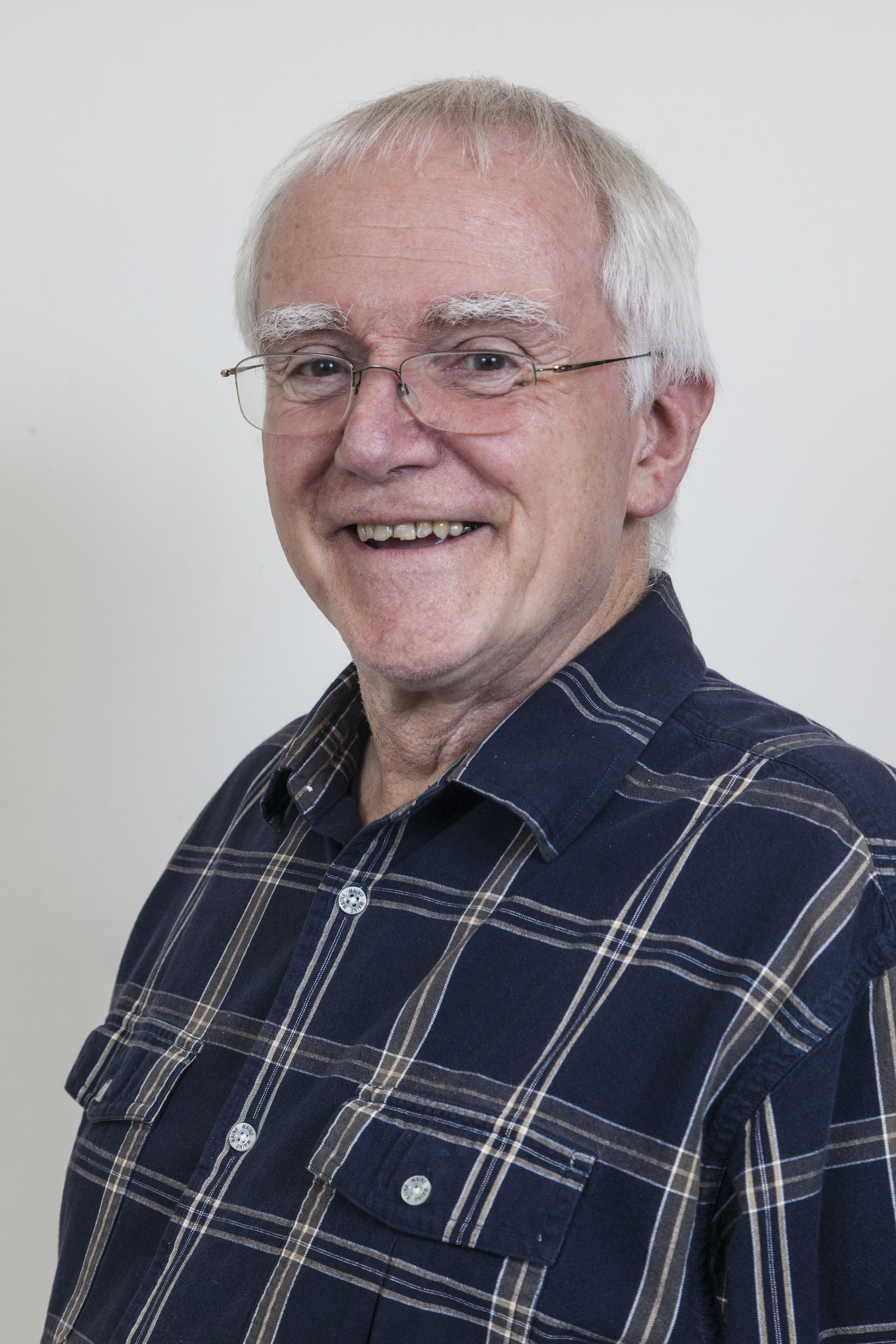

Background information
- Born: Roger William Jones; 15 May 1948 (age 78); Birmingham, England
- Genres: Contemporary Christian, Hymns
- Occupation: Composer • songwriter • conductor • music teacher
- Instrument: Piano • Organ • Cello
- Years active: 1970s–present
- Website: cmm.org.uk

Roger William Jones (born 1948) is an English musician and composer of church music. Alongside writing cantatas and hymn tunes he leads workshops and conducts performances of his works both around the UK and in other countries.

== Biography ==
Roger Jones was born in Birmingham on 15 May 1948, the son of Harold and Winifred Jones and studied piano, organ, cello and general musicianship at the Birmingham School of Music. After teacher training at City of Birmingham College of Education (now Birmingham City University Faculty of Education, Law and Social Sciences), in September 1969 he became Head of Music and then in September 1978 Head of Lower School at Aston Manor School (now Academy).

Writing songs for the pupils, his first musical, Jerusalem Joy, was performed at the school in 1973. Before giving up teaching in 1984 he wrote 5 more musicals: Apostle, David, A Grain of Mustard Seed about the Sunday School pioneer Robert Raikes, Saints Alive and Greater than Gold. Up to 2025, Roger Jones had composed a total of 25 musicals.

Since leaving teaching in 1984 he has worked full-time in Christian music, and is director of Christian Music Ministries, which publishes his works. A biography (Roger Jones Musical Man by Graham Allen: ISBN 978-1874594864) was published by Christian Music Ministries in 2015.

He currently hosts 'Heart and Soul' which is a regular two-hour weekly programme on Brumside Radio (formerly called South Birmingham Radio). In it he presents church music and chats to what are described by the internet radio station as high-profile guests within this musical genre.

In 2022, Roger suggested the idea of the Appledore Christian Music Festival. Currently an annual event, this brought together the Anglcan and the Baptist Church congregations in Appledore village, Devon. This has become an annual event with a wide range of musical styles.

He is a Lay Reader in the Church of England.

== Musical works ==
Cantatas

- Jerusalem Joy (1975)
- Stargazers (1976)
  Updated edition (2017)
- David (1976)
  Updated edition (2004)
- A Grain of Mustard Seed (1976)
  Updated edition (2006)
- Saints Alive (1982)
  Updated edition, new song added (2022) (ISBN 978 1 8380007 8 3)
- Apostle (1982)
  Updated edition (2013)
- Greater than Gold (1983)
- From Pharaoh to Freedom (1985)
- While Shepherds Watched (1987)
- The Torn Curtain (1988)
- Away in a Manger (1989)
- Mary Magdalene (1990)
  Additional lyrics by Horatius Bonar (1808–89), Cecil Frances Alexander (1823-95) and John Greenleaf Whittier (1807–82)
- Jairus' Daughter (1992)
  Additional words by Sylvia Bunting and Chris Ellis
  Hymn lyrics by Walter John Mathams (1853-1931)
- Angel Voices (1993)
- Pharisee (1996)
  With other words by Alison Fuggle and Charles Wesley (1707–88)
- Simeon (1997)
- Snakes & Ladders (1999)
  Lyrics, narrations and poems by Alison Fuggle
  Additional lyrics by Roger Jones and Cardinal John Henry Newman
  Opening music by Tim Jones
- Wildfire (2002)
  Lyrics and Narrations by Alison Fuggle
  Additional lyrics by Roger Jones, Samuel Crossman (1624–83) and Isaac Watts (1674-1748)
- Jail Break (2005)
  Additional music by Tim Jones
  Lyrics and Narrations by Alison Fuggle
  Additional lyrics by Roger Jones, Mary Jones, James Grindlay Small (1817–88) and Charles Wesley (1707-88)
- The Inn Crowd (2007)
  Lyrics and Narrations by Alison Fuggle
  Additional lyrics by Roger Jones, Peter H Lawrence, Edith Margaret Gellibrand Reed (1885-1933) and Reginald Heber (1783-1836)
- Rock (2008)
  Lyrics and narrative links by Alison Fuggle
  Additional lyrics by Roger Jones, Augustus Toplady (1740–78), E Mote (1797-1874) and traditional
- Two Sisters and a Funeral (2010)
  Three songs by Tim Jones
  Lyrics and narrative links by Alison Fuggle
  Additional lyrics by Roger Jones, Robert Grant (1779-1838), Samuel T. Francis (1834-1926) and Henry Francis Lyte (1793-1847)
- Barnabas (2015)
  Lyrics and narrative links by Alison Fuggle
  Additional lyrics by Roger Jones, J H Samis (1846-1919), William Whiting (1825-78) and Bishop Walsham How (1823–97)
- Torn Curtain (2019)
  Revision and expansion of The Torn Curtain without communion service setting
- Torn Curtain Communion setting (2019)
- Three Wise Camels (2020) (ISBN 978 1 8380007 1 4)
- Zac (2024) (ISBN 978 1 8380007 5 2)

Hymns and Carols

- The Roger Jones Hymn Collection (1999) published by Kevin Mayhew Ltd
  (2014) Revised edition published by Christian Music Ministries
- The Roger Jones Psalm Collection
- The Roger Jones Christmas Collection (2001)
- The Roger Jones Song Collection
- Seasons & Reasons (2010) hymn collection in collaboration with Bishop Timothy Dudley-Smith
- Songs of Christmas
- Songs of Easter (2022) (ISBN 978 1 8380007 3 8)

CD albums

- Jones! Got Rhythm
  featuring Tim, Michael and Roger Jones performing together
- All the published musical cantatas are available on CD.

== Books ==
- Worship Works (2013) ISBN 1-874594-76-7 by Roger Jones, Annie Routley and Helen Pollard. Cartoons by Tim Stanyon. Paintings by Ruth Butler.
- Spirit Works (2017) ISBN 1-874594-88-0 by Roger Jones, Annie Routley and Helen Pollard. Edited by Helen Pollard.

== Awards ==
- 2018 Mary Jones Prize from the British and Foreign Bible Society for Greater than Gold
- 2019 The Thomas Cranmer Award for Worship
