= Paul Fiddes =

English Baptist theologian (born 1947)

The Reverend Paul Stuart Fiddes FBA

Principal of Regent's Park College, Oxford
- In office 1989–2007
- Preceded by: B. R. White
- Succeeded by: Robert Ellis (theologian)

Professor of Systematic Theology, Oxford
- In office 2002–2014
- Succeeded by: Johannes Zachuber

Personal details
- Born: 30 April 1947 (age 79)
- Education: Drayton Manor Grammar School
- Alma mater: St Peter's College, Oxford; Regent's Park College, Oxford; Eberhard Karls University of Tübingen
- Known for: Principal of Regent's Park College, Oxford; Chairman of Theology Faculty, Oxford; Professor of Systematic Theology, Oxford
- Awards: Hon DD Bucharest 2004; Hon Fellow St Peter's College, Oxford 2004; Ecumenical Prebendary St Endellion 2012; Hon Ecumenical Canon Christ Church 2012; For the Sake of the Church (Festschrift) (2014); Within the Love of God (Festschrift) (2014); Fellow of the British Academy (2020)
- Website: Professor Paul Fiddes
- Writing career
- Notable works: The Creative Suffering of God (Oxford, 1988)

Paul Stuart Fiddes FBA (born 30 April 1947) is an English Baptist theologian and novelist.

Fiddes is Professor Emeritus of Systematic Theology in the University of Oxford, Principal Emeritus and Senior Research Fellow of Regent's Park College, Oxford (where he is director of the Project for the Study of Love in Religion), and a former chairman of the Oxford Faculty of Theology.

Fiddes has been described as "one of the leading contemporary Baptist theologians", "one of the leading scholars of theology and literature writing today", "one of Christianity's most distinguished scholars", and "one of the foremost theological thinkers of the modern age". His book The Creative Suffering of God is "considered to be one of the major contributions to theology in the last decades of the 20th century".

== Education ==
Fiddes was educated at Drayton Manor Grammar School. In 1965 he went up to St Peter's College, Oxford to read Philosophy, Politics, and Economics. He quickly changed his course and ended up with a Double First in English Language and Literature (BA Hons, 1968) and Theology (MA, 1972). The relationship between these disciplines has formed a major part of his subsequent scholarship. He completed his doctoral thesis in 1975, "The Hiddenness of Wisdom in the Old Testament and later Judaism" at Regent's Park College (the Baptist permanent private hall at Oxford) while undergoing ministerial formation. In 1976 he spent a year at the Eberhard Karls University of Tübingen undertaking post-doctoral studies and attending seminars of Jürgen Moltmann and Eberhard Jüngel. In 2004 he was awarded the D.D. of the University of Oxford for published work.

He has taught at Regent's since 1972, primarily as Research Fellow in Old Testament and Hebrew (1972–75), Fellow in Christian Doctrine (1975–89), Principal (1989–2007), Professorial Research Fellow and Director of Research (2007–2018) and Senior Research Fellow (2018 to the present). While undergoing his doctorate Fiddes also taught Middle English at St. Peter's College, Oxford and was later a Lecturer in Theology at St Peter's (1979–85).

== Career ==
Fiddes was ordained as a minister in the Baptist Union of Great Britain in 1972, and has extensive ecumenical concerns, including being a Canon Emeritus of Christ Church Cathedral, Oxford and Prebendary of St Endellion in North Cornwall.

He was a member of the Oxford Theology Faculty Board from 1989 to 2007, serving as chairman 1996–98, having been a senior member of the faculty since 1972. He was appointed Principal of Regent's Park in 1989 and was awarded the Title of Distinction of Professor of Systematic Theology in the University of Oxford in 2002. In 2007 he resigned as Principal of Regent's Park and was then appointed Principal Emeritus, Professorial Research Fellow, and Director of Research.

In 2004 Fiddes was elected an Honorary Fellow of St Peter's, on which occasion he was described as being "recognised internationally as one of the leading scholars in the fields of theology and literature". Later in that year, he was awarded the degree of Doctor of Divinity, the highest that the University confers. In 2002 he was chosen to preach the university Sermon on the Grace of Humility, and in 2005 he was appointed to deliver the Oxford Bampton Lectures, choosing as his topic Seeing the world and knowing God: ancient wisdom and modern doctrine. In 2004 he became an Honorary Doctor of Divinity of the University of Bucharest. He is also a Trustee Fellow of Georgetown College. He was elected a Fellow of the British Academy in 2020.

Fiddes is currently Director of the Project for Love and Religion, editing and contributing to the "Studies of Love in Religion" series. He is also involved in a project alongside Prof. Christopher Southgate, Dr. Bethany Sollereder, Revd. Dr. Michael Lloyd, Prof. Neil Messer and Prof. Mark Wynn focussing on evolutionary theodicy.

== Professional activities ==
Fiddes is a member of the editorial board of Ecclesiology: The Journal for Ministry, Mission and Unity and Ecclesial Practices. He is a consultant editor for Studies in Baptist History and Thought, published by Paternoster Press, and a series editor of New Critical Thinking in Religion, Theology and Biblical Studies (Ashgate). He is General Editor of the Regent's Study Guides series, published jointly by the college and the American publisher Smyth & Helwys.

Fiddes has served as a member of ecumenical study commissions for the British Council of Churches and its successor Churches Together in Britain and Ireland, Chairman of the Doctrine and Worship Committee of the Baptist Union of Great Britain, Convenor of the Division for Theology and Education of the European Baptist Federation, Chair of the Baptist Doctrine and Inter-Church Cooperation Study Commission of the Baptist World Alliance. A committed ecumenist, Fiddes was Baptist Chair of the Anglican Communion-Baptist World Alliance International Conversations from 2000 until 2005 and has also been, together with the Most Reverend Dr Arthur J. Serratelli, Co-Moderator of the second series of Roman Catholic-Baptist World Alliance International Conversations (Second Series 2006–10). He is also an Ecumenical Representative to the General Synod of the Church of England. The Anglican community has honoured him in 2012 as an Honorary Ecumenical Canon of Christ Church Cathedral, Oxford (ex officio a member of the Greater Chapter of the cathedral) and as the first ever Ecumenical Prebendary of the Collegiate Church of St Endellion. He shares the latter honour with Rowan Williams, whom he "vested in the traditional fur almuce" upon the occasion of his admission and installation as a prebendary.

=== Lectures ===
In 2009, Fides delivered the Holley-Hull Lectures at Samford University on the subject Telling the Christian Story in Our World Today. In 2009 he delivered the Nordenhaug Lectures at the International Baptist Theological Seminary of the European Baptist Federation in Prague on the subject "Post Modernity and Wisdom". These lectures will be prepared for future publication. (Previous Nordenhaug Lecturers include Miroslav Volf, Henry B. Wright Professor of Theology at Yale Divinity School, I. Howard Marshall, Professor of New Testament Exegesis in the University of Aberdeen, Elisabeth Schüssler Fiorenza, Krister Stendahl Professor of Divinity at Harvard Divinity School, Jürgen Moltmann, Professor of Systematic Theology in the University of Tübingen.)

In 2010 (7–9 July) Fiddes was Main Speaker at the conference of the Australian and New Zealand Association of Theological Schools/Australian and New Zealand Society for Theological Studies, on "The Future of God", at Trinity College (University of Melbourne). At the same time he also spoke, as a keynote speaker, at the Melbourne College of Divinity Centenary Conference (5–7 July). Fiddes was a keynote speaker at "The Power of the Word: Poetry, Theology and Life", a conference held jointly between Heythrop College and the Institute of English Studies. Fiddes was also a keynote speaker at the 2010 Biennial Conference of the International Society for Religion, Literature and Culture, St Catherine's College, Oxford (23–26 September 2010) on the topic "Attending to the Other: Critical Theory and Spiritual Practice".

== Studies of Fiddes's theology ==
Past Event and Present Salvation: the Christian Idea of Atonement (London: Darton, Longman, & Todd, 1989), one of Fiddes's most important works, was studied by the Reverend Father Eamonn Mulcahy, C.S.Sp., in his doctoral thesis at the Pontifical Gregorian University under the supervision of the distinguished Australian Jesuit scholar Gerald O'Collins. His thesis, which was entitled The Cause of Our Salvation: Soteriological Causality According to Some Modern British Theologians, 1988-98, also considered works by Colin Gunton, Vernon White, and John McIntyre. The thesis is now published as Eamonn Mulcahy, The Cause of Our Salvation: Soteriological Causality according to some Modern British Theologians, 1988-98 (Tesi Gregoriana Serie Teologia 140, Roma: Editrice Pontificia Università Gregoriana, 2007).

Fiddes is also the subject of Daniel John Sutcliffe-Pratt, Covenant and church for rough sleepers: a Baptist ecclesiology in conversation with the trinitarian pastoral theology of Paul S. Fiddes (Centre for Baptist History and Heritage studies, Occasional papers, vol. 14; Oxford: Regent's Park College, 2017).

Alistair Cuthbert, a lecturer in biblical studies and theology at the Scottish Baptist College, has written his doctoral thesis on the theology of Paul Fiddes at the University of St Andrews, entitled Participating in Divine Conflict: Constructing a Baptist-Charismatic Theology of Spiritual Warfare in Dialogue with Paul S. Fiddes

Martin Hobgen, minister at Swaything Baptist Church, has used Fiddes' work in his PhD at Manchester University developing Fiddes' concepts of covenant and perichoresis to argue for a type of friendship between disabled and non-disabled congregants.

== Novelist ==
Fiddes published a novel, A Unicorn Dies: A Novel of Mystery and Ideas in 2018 (Oxford: Firedint Publishing). It was reviewed in the online newspaper The Baptist Times by Hugh Whittaker, who wrote "A Unicorn Dies operates on several levels. It is both gripping and complex. I very much enjoyed this quest with Giles [the protagonist], and look forward to the next novel. It won't be an easy act to follow."

== Publications ==
Fiddes is the sole author of over 12 academic books, one novel, and more than 128 articles, book chapters, and published lectures. He has also written five books as a joint author and is additionally the editor or co-editor of 12 books. His work is published by some of the world's leading publishers, including Oxford University Press, Cambridge University Press, University of Wales Press, Mercer University Press, Sheffield Academic Press, Blackwell, Ashgate, Springer, Liturgical Press, Paternoster, Eerdmans, SPCK, SCM, DLT, and Marshall Pickering.

Fiddes has also been honoured with two Festschriften:

- Anthony Clarke, ed., For the Sake of the Church: Essays in Honour of Paul S. Fiddes, with a foreword by Rex Mason (Centre for Baptist History and Heritage studies, 3; Oxford: Centre for Baptist History and Heritage, Regent's Park College: 2014)
- Anthony Clarke and Andrew Moore, eds., Within the Love of God: Essays on the Doctrine of God in Honour of Paul S. Fiddes (Oxford: Oxford University Press, 2014)

== List of sole-authored books ==
=== Novel ===
- A Unicorn Dies: A Novel of Mystery and Ideas. Oxford: Firedint Publishing. 2018.

=== Monographs ===
- The Creative Suffering of God. Oxford: Clarendon Press. 1988.
- Past Event and Present Salvation: The Christian Idea of Atonement. London: Darton, Longman, & Todd. 1989.
- Freedom and Limit: A Dialogue between Literature and Christian Doctrine. Basingstoke Macon: Macmillan. 1991. (Also published by Mercer University Press, 1999)
- The Holy Spirit. Edinburgh Studies in Constructive Theology. Edinburgh: Edinburgh University Press. 1999.
- The Promised End: Eschatology in Theology and Literature. Oxford: Blackwell. 2000.
- Participating in God: A Pastoral Doctrine of the Trinity. London: Darton, Longman, & Todd. 2000.
- The Novel, Spirituality and Modern Culture. Religion, Culture & Society. Cardiff: University of Wales Press. 2000.
- Tracks and Traces: Baptist Identity in Church and Theology. Studies in Baptist History and Thought. Carlisle: Paternoster. 2003.
- Freedom and Limit: A Dialogue Between Literature and Christian Doctrine. Mercer University Press. 2003.
- Seeing the World and Knowing God: Hebrew Wisdom and Christian Doctrine in a Late-Modern Context. Oxford: Oxford University Press. 2013.
- Charles Williams and C.S. Lewis: Friends in Co-Inherence. Oxford: Oxford University Press. 2021.
- Iris Murdoch and the Others: A Writer in Dialogue with Theology. London: T.&T. Clark. 2021.
- More Things in Heaven and Earth: Shakespeare, Theology, and the Interplay of Texts. Charlottesville, VA: University of Virginia Press. 2022. (Originally given as the 2018 Richard E. Myers Lectures at University Baptist Church, Charlottesville, VA, under the title The Play's the Thing: Shakespeare and Religion)

=== Edited volumes ===
- Reflection on the Water: Understanding God and the World through the Baptism of Believers. Macon: Mercer University Press. 1996.
- E. Brandt; J. Molthagen, eds. (1996). Gemeinschaft am Evangelium. Festschrift fur Wiard Popkes. Leipzig: Evangelische Verlagsanstalt.
- W. H. Brackney; John H. Y. Briggs, eds. (1999). Pilgrim Pathways: Essays in Baptist History in Honour of B. R. White. Macon: Mercer University Press.
- The Novel, Spirituality and Modern Culture: Eight Novelists Write about their Craft and their Context. Cardiff: Cardiff University Press. 2000.
- Faith in the Centre: Christianity and Culture. Regent's Study Guides 9. Macon: Smyth & Helwys. 2001.
- Anthony J. Clarke, ed. (2005). Flickering Images: Theology and Film in Dialogue. Regent's Study Guides 12. Macon: Smyth & Helwys.
- Under the Rule of Christ: Dimensions in Baptist Spirituality. Regent's Study Guides 14. Macon: Smyth & Helwys. 2008.
- Gunther Bader, ed. (2013). The Spirit and the Letter: A Tradition and a Reversal. London: T & T Clark.
- Jochen Schmidt, ed. (2013). Rhetorik des Bosen/The Rhetoric of Evil: Studien des Bonner Zentrums fur Religion und Gesellschaft. Wurzburg: Ergon Verlag.
- Sharing Faith at the Boundaries of Unity: Further Conversations between Anglians and Baptists. Centre for Baptist History and Heritage Studies vol. 12. Oxford: Regent's Park College. 2015.
- "A World-Order of Love": Baptists and the Peace Movements of 1914". Centre for Baptist History and Heritage Studies vol. 15. Oxford: Regent's Park College. 2017.
- William H. Brackney; Malcolm B. Yarnell III (2018). The Fourth strand of the Reformation: The Covenant Ecclesiology of Anabaptists, English Separatists, and Early General Baptists. Centre for Baptist History and HEritage Studies vol. 17. Oxford: Regent's Park College.
- Sharing the Faith at the Boundaries of Unity: Further Conversations between Anglicans and Baptists. Centre for Baptist History and HEritage Studies vol. 12. Oxford: Regent's Park College. 2019.
- David Bebbington; Elizabeth H. Flowers; Steven R. Harmon, eds. (2026). The Oxford Handbook of Baptist Studies. The Oxford Handbooks. Oxford: OUP.

=== Co-authored volumes ===
- Laurie Guy (2009). Making Sense of the Book of Revelation. Regent's Study Guides 15. Macon: Smyth & Helwys.
- Stephen R. Holmes; Paul D. Molnar; Thomas H. McCall (2014). Jason Sexton; Stanley N. Gundry (eds.). Two Views on the Doctrine of the Trinity. Counterpoints: Bible and Theology. Grand Rapids: Zondervan.
- Brian Haymes; Richard Kidd (2014). Baptists and the Communion of Saints: A Theology of Covenanted Disciples. Waco: Baylor University Press/Gazelle.
- Anthony Clarke (2017). Dissenting Spirit: A History of Regent's Park College 1752-2017. Centre for Baptist History and Heritage Studies. Oxford: Regent's Park College.
- Brian Haymes; Richard Kidd (2020). Communion, Covenant, and Creativity: An Approach to the Communion of Saints through the Arts. Eugene: Cascade Books.
- Christopher Southgate; Michael Lloyd; Neil Messer; Bethany Sollereder; Mark R. Wynn (2025). God, Struggle, and Suffering in the Evolution of Life. Edinburgh: T&T Clark.

=== Booklets/pamphlets ===
- The Escape and the City: Old Testament Study. Baptist Union Training Programme. London: Baptist Union. 1974.
- Charismatic Renewal: A Baptist View. London: Baptist Publications. 1980.
- A Leading Question: The Structure and Authority of Leadership in the Local Church. London: Baptist Publications. 1980.
- Brian Haymes; Richard Kidd; Michael Quicke (1997). On the Way of Trust. Oxford: Whitley Publications.

=== Commentaries ===
- "Romans Through the Centuries". Wiley Blackwell Bible Commentaries. Hobken: Wiley Blackwell. 2025.

=== Steering Group Reports ===
- The Faith and Unity Executive Committee; Doctrine and Worship Committee (1994). Nature of the Assembly and the Council of the Baptist Union of Great Britain. London: Baptist Union of Great Britain.
- Brian Haymes; Richard Kidd; Michael Quicke (1996). Something to Declare: A Study of the Declaration of Principle of the Baptist Union of Great Britain. London: Baptist Publications.
- Brian Haymes; Richard L. Kidd; Michael Quicke (2000). Doing Theology in a Baptist Way. Oxford: Whitley Publications.
- Faith and Unity Executive Committee of the Baptist Union of Great Britain; The Council for hristian Unity of the Church of England (2005). Pushing at the Boundaries of Unity: Anglicans and Baptists in Conversation. London: Church House Publishing.
