= W. Wesley Pue =

Canadian lawyer (1954–2019)

William Wesley Pue
- Born: October 20, 1954
- Died: April 3, 2019 (aged 64)
- Occupations: Lawyer; academic

William Wesley Pue (October 20, 1954 – April 3, 2019) was a Canadian lawyer, academic, and the Nemetz Professor of Legal History at the Peter A. Allard School of Law at the University of British Columbia, Vancouver, British Columbia. He was also a past President of the Canadian Law and Society Association.

== Early life ==
Pue was educated in England at Gresham's School, Holt, then at Regent's Park College, Oxford, graduating BA in Geography in 1977 and BA in Jurisprudence in 1979. He transferred to the University of Alberta, where he graduated Master of Laws in 1980.

== Career ==
Pue was called to the bars of the Northwest Territories and Alberta in 1981. He taught at Osgoode Hall Law School, Oklahoma City University, Carleton University and the University of Manitoba where he was Johnson Professor of Legal History and director of the Canadian Legal History Project. He graduated Juris Doctor from Osgoode in 1989, and in 1993 joined the University of British Columbia's Faculty of Law as its first holder of the Nemetz Chair in legal history. From 1996 to 1998 he was director of UBC's graduate programme in law . Pue served a short stint as provost of the University of British Columbia Okanagan campus from 2011-2013

As Nemetz professor, Pue taught courses in legal history, the legal profession, and legal knowledge. His research interests were in law and society, legal pluralism, and the history of law. He published articles in the fields of English and Canadian legal history, the history of the legal profession, administrative law, law and geography, and law and society.

Dr. Pue was on leave from the Peter A. Allard School of Law to serve as Vice-Provost and Associate Vice-President Academic Resources for the University of British Columbia.

He died on April 3, 2019, aged 64.

== Selected publications ==
- Law School: the Story of Legal Education in British Columbia (1995)
- 'Lawyers & Political Liberalism in 18th & 19th Century England', in Lucien Karpik and Terrence Halliday, eds., Legal Professions and Political Liberalism pp. 239–302 (Oxford University Press, 1997)
- Lawyers and Vampires: Cultural Histories of Legal Professions (co-ed. with David Sugarman, Ashgate Press, 1999)
- Misplaced Traditions: Colonial and Post-colonial approaches to legal professions in British Colonies (co-ed. with Robert McQueen, 1998)
- 'Lawyering for A Fragmented World' in International Journal of the Legal Profession (1998)
- 'The disquisitions of learned Judges: Making Manitoba Lawyers, 1885-1931', in Jim Phillips and G. Blaine Baker, eds., Essays in the History of Canadian Law: in honour of R.C.B. Risk (Toronto: Osgoode Society, 1999)
