= Robin Attfield =

British academic

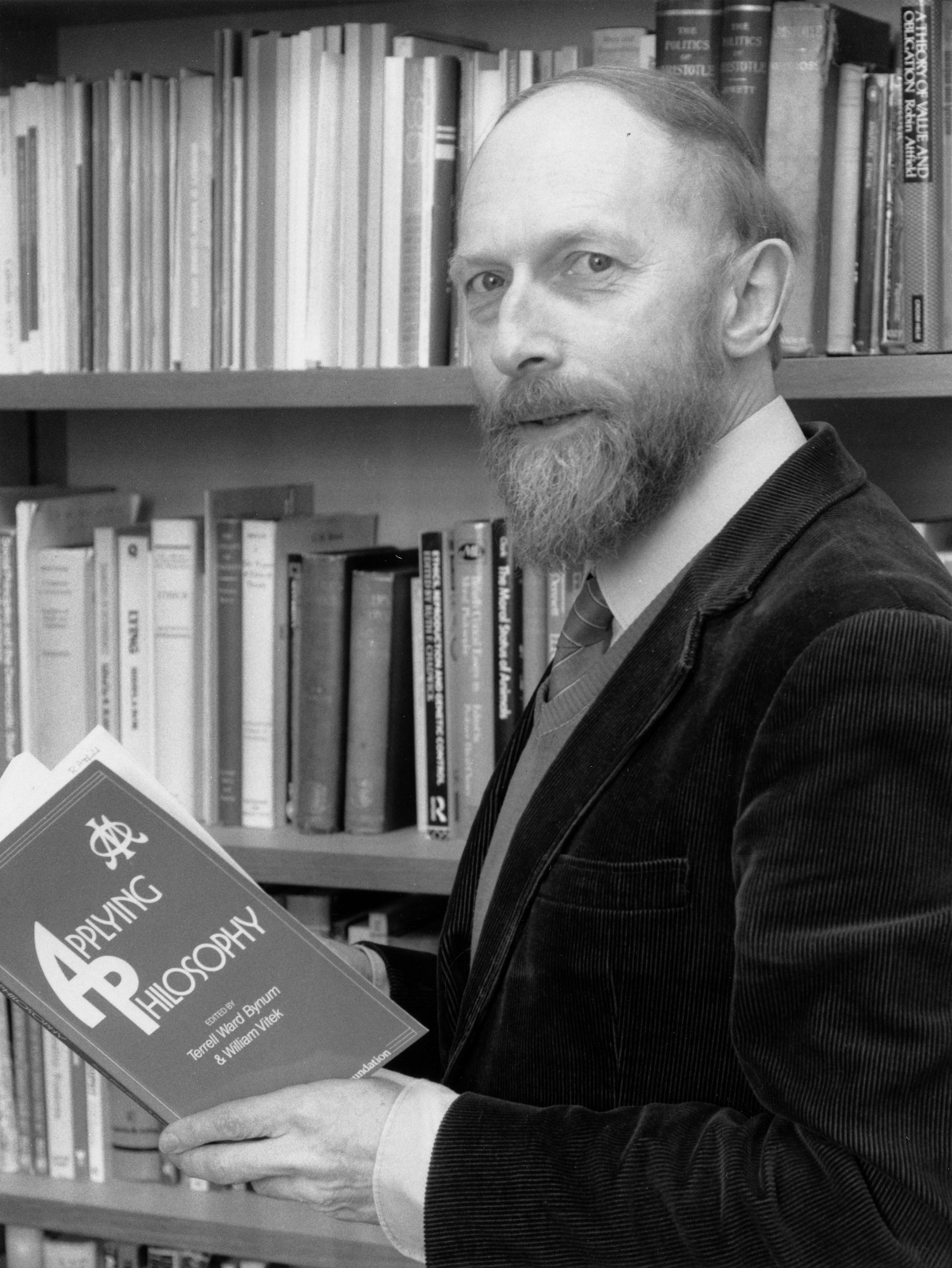
Attfield at Cardiff University

Robin Attfield is a British philosopher known for his work on environmental philosophy, ethics, the history of philosophy and the philosophy of religion. He is an Emeritus Professor of Philosophy at Cardiff University.

Attfield read Greats (philosophy, classics and ancient history) at Christ Church and theology at Regent's Park College, Oxford. He began lecturing at Cardiff in 1968, completing a PhD at the University of Wales in 1972. He was promoted to Professor in 1992, and was awarded a DLitt by Cardiff in 2008. He is a member of the Council of the Royal Institute of Philosophy; a former co-opted member of the executive committee of the British Philosophical Association; Chair of the Cardiff Branch of the Royal Institute of Philosophy; and a former member of the UNESCO working party on environmental ethics.

== Select bibliography ==
Books authored or edited by Robin Attfield include:

- Environmental Ethics: An Overview for the Twenty-First Century (Polity-Blackwell, 2003; 2nd Ed 2014-03-31)
- Creation, Evolution and Meaning (Ashgate, 2006).ISBN 978-0754604754
- Environmental Ethics and Global Sustainability, in Henk A.M.J. ten Have (ed.), Environmental Ethics and International Policy, Paris: UNESCO, 2006, 69–87, ISBN 92-3-104039-1; ISBN 978-92-3-104039-9
- Robin Attfield, God and The Secular: A Philosophical Assessment of Secular Reasoning from Bacon to Kant (2nd edn.), Aldershot: Gregg Revivals and Brookfield, VT: Ashgate, 1993, pp. 231, ISBN 0-7512-0243-6.
- Robin Attfield, The Ethics of Environmental Concern, (2nd. edn., 31 Aug. 1991) ISBN 978-0820313443, translated into Korean by Seunghoe Koo, Seoul: Earth Love Publications, 1997, pp. 377, ISBN 89-85277-21-9.
- Robin Attfield, A Theory of Value and Obligation, London, Sydney, New York: Croom Helm, 1987, pp. x + 262, ISBN 0-7099-0572-6.
- Robin Attfield and Katharine Dell (eds.), Values, Conflict and the Environment (Report of the environmental ethics interdisciplinary Working Party of the Ian Ramsey Centre, St. Cross College, Oxford), 2nd edn., Aldershot: Avebury, and Brookfield, VT: Ashgate, 1996, pp. xii + 174; ISBN 1-85972-491-4.
- Robin Attfield and Barry Wilkins (eds.), International Justice and the Third World: Essays in the Philosophy of Development, London and New York: Routledge, 1992, pp. ix + 207, ISBN 0-415-06924-6 (hb); ISBN 0-415-06925-4 (pb).
- Robin Attfield, Environmental Philosophy: Principles and Prospects, Aldershot: Avebury and Brookfield, VT: Ashgate, 1994(i), pp.viii + 262; ISBN 1-85628-566-9.
- Robin Attfield and Andrew Belsey (eds.), Philosophy and the Natural Environment (also published as Royal Institute of Philosophy Supplement 36), Cambridge: Cambridge University Press, 1994(ii), pp. vi + 250, ISBN 0-521-46903-1.
- Robin Attfield, Value, Obligation and Meta-Ethics, Amsterdam and Atlanta: Rodopi, 1995, pp. xv + 319; ISBN 90-5183-857-3 (hb); ISBN 90-5183-862-X (pb). (Republished
- Robin Attfield, The Ethics of the Global Environment, Edinburgh: Edinburgh University Press, 1999, in the World Ethics Series edited by Nigel Dower, pp. viii + 232, ISBN 07486-0895-8; also West Lafayette, IN: Purdue University Press, 1999, ISBN 1-55753-189-7.
- Robin Attfield, Environmental Ethics: An Overview for the Twenty-First Century, Polity Press, Cambridge, and Blackwell, Malden, MA, 2003, pp. xii + 232. ISBN 0-7456-2737-4 (hb); ISBN 0-7456-2738-2 (pb); (2nd Edn) 14-Mar-2014 ISBN 978-0745652535
- Robin Attfield, Creation, Evolution and Meaning, Aldershot, UK and Burlington, VT: Ashgate, 2006, pp. ix + 234. ISBN 0-7546-0474-8 and ISBN 0-7546-0475-6. (Also an e-book)
- Robin Attfield (ed.), The Ethics of the Environment, Farnham, UK and Burlington, VT: Ashgate, 2008, pp. xxx + 620, ISBN 978-0-7546-2786-9.
- Robin Attfield, Ethics: An Overview, London and New York: Continuum/Bloomsbury, 2012, pp. xii + 262. ISBN 978-1-4411-4403-4 (hb); ISBN 978-1-4411-8205-0 (pb). (Also an e-book)
- Editors: Robin Attfield, Lucas Andrianos, Jan-Willem Sneep, Guillermo KerberSustainable Alternatives for Poverty Reduction and Eco-Justice: Volume 1; 1 Dec 2014 (hb); ISBN 978-1443866897
- Robin Attfield: Every Teacher a Leader: Developing and Realizing Potential 15 Dec 2007 (pb); ISBN 978-1855392267
- Ed. Robin Attfield and Barry Wilkins International Justice and the Third World: Studies in the Philosophy of Development; 1 Nov 1992; (pb) ISBN 978-0415069250
- Robin Attfield: Environmental Ethics: A Very Short Introduction; 13 Dec 2018 (pb) ISBN 978-0198797166
- Robin Attfield: Wonder, Value and God: 18 Sep 2018; (pb) ISBN 978-1138388161
- Robin Attfield: Environmental Thought: A Short History; 2021; Polity. ISBN 978-1-509-53667-2
- Robin Attfield: Applied Ethics: An Introduction; 2022; Polity. ISBN 978-1-509-54738-8
