= Walter John Mathams =

British hymnwriter and clergyman (1853–1931)

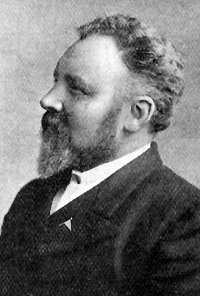
- Born: 30 October 1853; London, England
- Died: 29 January 1931 (aged 77); Swanage, England
- Other name: W. J. Mathams
- Education: Regent's Park College, Oxford.

Ecclesiastical career
- Church: Baptist

Walter John Mathams was a nineteenth-century British hymnwriter, soldier and minister, who attended Regent's Park College in London in the 1870s as a Baptist ministerial student before converting to the Established Church of Scotland in 1900. He also founded the Ladies' Guild of the Sailors' Society.

== Life ==
After going to sea early on in life, he found himself participating in the Yukon Gold Rush. After failing to find his fortune, he returned to England by way of Palestine. Once back in the United Kingdom, he began studying for Baptist ministry. In 1874, he entered Regent's Park Baptist College, and subsequently became the pastor at Preston, Lancashire. In 1879, his health failing, he went for a while to Australia.

Returning to England, he became, in 1883, minister at Falkirk, Scotland, and at Birmingham in 1888. He entered the ministry of the Established Church of Scotland in 1900, served for three years as chaplain to the Royal Scots Borderers, in Egypt. In 1906, he became an associate minister at Stronsay, in the Orkney Islands. In 1909, he was ordained a full minister at St. Columba's Church, Mallaig, on the north west Scottish coast. In 1919, he retired and moved to Roslin, near Edinburgh. After his wife Alexa Jane died, he moved to Swanage, Dorset

== Select hymnology ==
Mathams published most of his hymns whilst a student at Regent's Park College, in a small hymnbook entitled "At Jesus' Feet". Attributed to him by the Dictionary of Hymnology are the following hymns:

- Bright falls the morning light
- Gentle Jesus, full of grace
- Go, work for God, and do not say.
- God loves the little sparrows
- Jesus, Friend of little children
- My heart, 0 God, be wholly Thine
- No room for Thee, Lord Jesus
- Reign in my heart, Great God
- Sailing on the ocean
- God is with Us
- Christ of the Upward Way
- Jesus, Friend of Little Children
- Now in the Days of Youth
- Stand Fast for Christ Thy Saviour

== Other works ==
- At Jesus’ Feet (1876)
- Fireside Parables (1879)
- Sunday Parables (1883)
