= Rod Morgan =

British criminologist

Chairman of the Youth Justice Board
- In office April 2004 – January 2007
- Appointed by: David Blunkett
- Preceded by: Sir Charles Pollard (Acting)
- Succeeded by: Graham Robb (Interim)

Rodney Emrys Morgan (born 16 February 1942) was Criminology lecturer at the University of Bath in the early 1980s and is professor emeritus, University of Bristol and visiting professor at the University of Sussex. He is the former chair of the Youth Justice Board for England and Wales (2004–7) and prior to that was HM Chief Inspector of Probation for England and Wales (2001–4).

He is the author of many books and articles on criminal justice and penal policy and was co-editor (with Mike Maguire and Robert Reiner) of the influential 'Oxford Handbook of Criminology' (5th Ed, 2012, Oxford University Press). He is a regular advisor to Amnesty International and the Council of Europe on custodial conditions and standards with particular reference to the prevention of torture and inhuman and degrading treatment or punishment, being co-author (with Malcolm Evans) of the Council of Europe's official guide to the European Convention for the Prevention of Torture (Preventing Torture in Europe, Strasbourg, Council of Europe, 2001). He frequently acts as an expert witness in extradition proceedings in which there is a possible breach of Article 3 of the European Convention for the Protection of Fundamental Human Rights, which forbids torture or inhuman or degrading treatment or punishment.

He has held almost every post it is possible to hold part-time within the criminal justice system, locally (magistrate, member of a police authority, chairman of a local authority crime and disorder partnership, etc.), nationally (Parole Board, inspector, member of government advisory committee, government advisor) and internationally (ad hoc advisor to the Council of Europe, UN, ICRC, etc.). He was an Assessor to Lord Justice Woolf's Inquiry into the 1990 prison disturbances, was until 2011 a Ministry of Justice-appointed advisor to the criminal justice inspectorates for England and Wales and has most recently been a member of the Daniel Morgan Independent Panel (a Government inquiry into Daniel Morgan's murder in 1987).

He has been a trustee or advisor for several organisations concerned with criminal justice research and policy (Police Foundation, Centre for Crime and Justice Studies, Criminal Justice Alliance) or working with young people in trouble (Dance United, Mentoring Plus, Bath, Catch 22, Jamie's Farm). He was a member of the Centre for Social Justice Working Parties on imprisonment and youth justice and was a member of the academic advisory board for Cumberland Lodge, Windsor.

He has been a regular broadcaster, speaker and writer on all the above topics.

His other interests include walking, sailing and live music. He was chairman of the board of trustees for Bath Philharmonia (2008–15) and has been a Trustee on the Bath Festivals Board.

He has been awarded honorary degrees by the Universities of Bath (Doctor of Laws, 2007) and the West of England (Doctor of Laws 2005).

His Time as Chairman of the Youth Justice Board

Morgan took up office as Chairman of the YJB in April 2004 following the departure of the founder chairman, Lord Warner, in summer 2003 and the temporary interregnum of Sir Charles Pollard. He demonstrated his conspicuous independence by questioning, mostly behind the scenes but occasionally in public, the wisdom of the Government's anti-social behaviour policy as it impacted youth. He also made it clear that he considered his role to include representing to Government the front-line operational experience of youth offending team (YOT) practitioners and argued that the YJB should adopt a less directive and a more supportive stance than hitherto. He argued that the strength of the reformed youth justice system lay in the YOTs being devolved, multi-agency, locally accountable agencies. He also argued strongly for less reliance by the courts on custody for children and young people. In January 2007 Morgan resigned his office on the grounds that the Government was doing insufficient to reverse two trends about which he was unhappy: the greatly increased criminalisation of children and young people; and the continuing growth in the number of children and young people in custody. Since his departure from the Board Morgan has critically described both trends in some detail in newspaper articles, broadcasts and in articles and contributions to books and has welcomed the marked reversal of both trends since 2008.

His Time as HM Chief Inspector of Probation

Morgan became the first Chief Inspector of Probation not to have a career background in probation. He oversaw the transition from an inspectorate which functioned as an arm of the Home Office in relation to more or less autonomous, local probation services, to an independent inspectorate of a national probation service managed by a National Probation Directorate within the Home Office (later to become part of a National Offender Management Service within a Ministry of Justice). He argued for and introduced the joint inspection of youth offending teams (YOTs), arrangements which were to be led by HM Inspectorate of Probation. In his annual reports he expressed doubts about placing too much reliance on cognitive behavioural programmes for offenders and argued against the 'sentencing drift' which he maintained was serving to 'silt up' probation caseloads. He suggested that approximately one third of all offenders being supervised by the Probation Service did not need the attention of the Service and in former times would have been dealt with by less intrusive methods. In 2003-4 he chaired the Criminal Justice Chief Inspectors Group yet argued publicly for the amalgamation of the five criminal justice inspectorates to form a single Criminal Justice Inspectorate. This idea was pursued by the Government but in 2006 abandoned in the face of Parliamentary opposition. He has been sharply critical of the break up of the Probation Service and its substantial privatisation.

Published work includes:

1976 (with R.D.King) A Taste of Prison: a Study of Trial and Remand Prisoners, London: Routledge,

1979 (with R.D.King) Crisis in the Prisons: the Way Out, University of Southampton,.

1979 Formulating Penal Policy: the Future of the Advisory Council on the Penal System, London: NACRO.

1980 (with R.D.King) The Future of the Prison System, Farnborough: Gower.

1984 (with C.Maggs) Following Scarman: A Survey of Police Community Consultation Arrangements in Provincial Police Authorities in England and Wales May, 1984 Centre for the Analysis of Social Policy, University of Bath.

1985 (with M.Maguire and J.Vagg) Prisons and Accountability: Opening up a Closed World, London: Tavistock.

1985 Setting the P.A.C.E.: Police Community Consultation Arrangements in England and Wales, Centre for the Analysis of Social Policy, University of Bath.

1989 The Perrie Lectures 1988, Remands in Custody: problems and prospects, London: Home Office, Prison Department

1989 (with C.Kemp) Behind the Front Counter: Lay Visitors to Police Stations, Bath/Bristol Centre for Criminal Justice Papers No 1.

1989 (ed. with D.Smith) Coming to Terms with Policing: questions of policy, London: Routledge.

1990 (with C.Kemp) Lay Visitors to Police Stations: Report to the Home Office, Bristol Centre for Criminal Justice.

1990 (ed.) Policing and Crime Prevention: Papers from the British Criminology Conference 1989, Bristol Centre for Criminal Justice.

1990 (ed. with S.Greer) The Right to Silence Debate, Bristol Centre for Criminal Justice.

1991 (with H.Jones) Report of an Experiment in 13 Prisons Using Magistrates' Court Clerks to Clerks Boards of Visitors Adjudications, Prison Service, Home Office.

1993 (with M.Barker) Sex Offenders: A Framework for the Evaluation of Community-Based Treatment, London: Home Office Research and Planning Unit.

1993 (with C.Hall) Lay Visitors to Police Stations: An Update, Bristol: Centre for Criminal Justice/National Association for Lay Visitors.

1994 (ed. with M.Maguire and R.Reiner) The Oxford Handbook of Criminology, Oxford: Clarendon Press.

1995 (ed. with C.Clarkson) The Politics of Sentencing Reform, Oxford: Oxford University Press.

1995 Making Consultation Work: A Handbook for those involved in police community consultation arrangements, London: Police Foundation.

1997 (with T.Newburn) The Future of Policing, Oxford: Oxford University Press.

1997 (ed. with M.Maguire and R.Reiner) The Oxford Handbook of Criminology, 2nd edition, Oxford: Clarendon Press.

1998 (with M.Evans) Preventing Torture: A Study of the European Committee for the Prevention of Torture and Inhuman or Degrading Treatment or Punishment, Oxford: Clarendon Press.

1998 (with Hoyle, Cape and Sanders) Evaluation of the 'One Stop Shop' and Victim Statement Pilot Projects, Home Office, Research Development and Statistics Directorate.

1999 (ed. with P. Carlen) Crime Unlimited? Questions for the New Millennium, Basingstoke: Macmillan.

1999 (with Davis, Hoyano, Keenan and Maitland) An Assessment of the Admissibility and Sufficiency of Evidence in Child Abuse Prosecutions, London: Home Office.

1999 (ed with M. Evans) Protecting Prisoners: The Standards of the European Committee for the Prevention of Torture in Context, Oxford: Oxford University Press.

1999 (with Sanders) The Uses to which Victim Statements are put, London: Home Office.

2000 (with Russell) The Judiciary in the Magistrates Courts, London: LCD/Home Office.

2001 (with Russell) Public Attitudes to The Sentencing of Domestic Burglary, London: Home Office/Sentencing Advisory Panel.

2001 (with Russell) Public Knowledge and Attitudes to Criminal Justice and Sentencing, London: Home Office.

2001 (with Evans) Combating Torture in Europe, Strasbourg: Council of Europe (translated into French (2002) Combattre la torture en Europe, Strasbourg: Council of Europe; and into Spanish (2002) Combattere la tortura nei luoghi de detenzione in Europa, Strasbourg: Council of Europe.

2002 (ed. with Maguire and Reiner) The Oxford Handbook of Criminology, 3rd Edition, Oxford: Clarendon Press.

2002 (with Evans) CPT Standards regarding prisoners (trans to French Les normes du CPT concernant les prisonniers), Geneva: Association for Prevention of Torture.

2002 (with Evans) the CPT's Standards on Police and Pre-trial custody (trans. to French Les normes du CPT en matiere de detention par la police et de detention preventive), Geneva: Association for Prevention of Torture.

2004 Report of an Inquiry into the Death of PC Gerald Walker at the hands of Mr David Parfitt, HM Inspectorate of Probation, London: HMIP.

2006 (with Hollins) Young People and Crime: Improving Provision for Children Who Offend, London: Karnac.

2007 (ed. with Gelsthorpe) Handbook of Probation, Cullompton: Willan.

2007 (ed. with Maguire and Reiner) Oxford Handbook of Criminology, 4th Ed, Oxford: OUP

2008 Summary Justice: Fast – but Fair?, Centre for Crime and Justice Studies, King's College, London.

2009 Too Much To Ask? The Leaps and Bounds Story, London: Solomon White/Arts Council England.

2010 On the question of Devolution of Youth Justice Responsibilities, Cardiff: Welsh Assembly Government.

2012 (ed. with Maguire and Reiner) Oxford Handbook of Criminology, 5th Ed, Oxford: OUP

2017 (with Smith' Delivering More with Less: Austerity and the politics of law and order' in Oxford Handbook of Criminology, 6th Ed.

2019 (with Bicknell and Evans) 'Preventing Torture in Europe' Council of Europe: Strasbourg.

2021 with O'Loan (chair), Casale and Kellet 'The Independent Daniel Morgan Panel Report' 3 Vols, HC,

Current Work Together with Stephen Shute of the University of Sussex he holds a British Academy award to undertake research on 'Inspection and Accountability of Criminal Justice Services' on which a book is planned to be published by OUP.

Leave those kids alone, New Statesman, Published 21 June 2010
