= Robert Ellis (theologian) =

British Baptist theologian, born 1956

Revered Robert Anthony Ellis

Principal of Regent's Park College, Oxford
- In office 2007–2021
- Preceded by: Paul Fiddes
- Succeeded by: Malcolm Evans (academic lawyer)

Personal details
- Born: 24 August 1956 (age 70) Cardiff, Wales
- Education: Regent's Park College, Oxford
- Awards: Being Attentive (Festschrift) (2021)
- Website: www.rpc.ox.ac.uk/people/dr-robert-ellis

Robert Anthony Ellis (born 24 August 1956) is a British academic and Baptist minister, who is Principal Emeritus (2007-2021) and Senior Research Fellow of Regent's Park College, Oxford.

He is an ordained minister in the Baptist Union of Great Britain and has served congregations in Milton Keynes and Bristol. While in ministry in Bristol he became part-time Tutor in Christian Doctrine at Bristol Baptist College. He was appointed Fellow and Tutor in Pastoral Theology at Regent's Park College Oxford in 2001, and then served as Principal from 2007 to 2021. Regent's Park College is a Permanent private Hall of the University of Oxford. Ellis played a major role in Training and Formation for Baptist Ministers' at the College both as Tutor and Principal. His retirement was marked by the unveiling of a portrait and by the presehtation of a book, a collection of essays in his honour.

== Education ==
In 1978 Ellis went to Regent's Park College, Oxford to read Theology achieving an MA (1981) and his DPhil in 1984.

== Career ==
Ellis was Tutor in Christian Doctrine at Bristol Baptist College (1991-2001) before being appointed to the staff at Regent’s Park, initially as Fellow and Tutor in Pastoral Studies (2001-2007), then as Principal (2007-2021) and now as Senior Research Fellow.

== Professional activities ==
Ellis has expertise in pastoral theology and systematic theology, theology of intercession, and Christianity and culture - especially theology and film, and theology and sport.

He serves on the Advisory Committee of the Vatican-sponsored programme 'Sport at the Service of Humanity.' He delivered the McCandless Lecture at Georgetown College in 2005 and again in 2010.

He has been Moderator of the Baptist Union of Great Britain Ministry Executive.

== Publications ==
=== Theses ===
- Ellis, Robert A. (1984). Can God Act in History? A Whiteheadian Perspective (Ph.D.). University of Oxford. OCLC 499852545.
- ——— (2004). Teaching Theology in the Academy: Preparing Men and Women for Ministry (Postgraduate Diploma in Learning and Teaching in Higher Education). University of Oxford.

=== Academic Books ===
- ——— (2005). Answering God: Towards a Theology of Intercession. Milton Keynes, UK: Paternoster. ISBN 9781842273401. OCLC 58482871.
- ——— (2014). The Games People Play: Theology, Religion, and Sport. Eugene OR: Wipf & Stock. ISBN 9780718843243. OCLC 892430480.

=== Edited Works ===
- ———; Goodyear, Peter, eds. (2018). Spaces of Teaching and Learning : Integrating Perspectives on Research and Practice. Singapur: Springer. ISBN 9789811071546. OCLC 1029110642.

=== Chapters in books ===
- ——— (2002). "Covenant and Creation". In Clarke, Anthony (ed.). Bound for Glory? God, Church and World in Covenant. Oxford: Whitley Publications. pp. 20–33. ISBN 0953974812.
- ——— (2005). "Movies and Meaning: An Introduction to Reading Films". In Clarke, Anthony; Fiddes, Paul S. (eds.). Flickering Images: Theology and Film in Dialogue. Oxford: Regent's Park College.
- ——— (2005). "Pondering Providence: Sliding Doors". In Clarke, Anthony; Fiddes, Paul S. (eds.). Flickering Images: Theology and Film in Dialogue. Oxford: Regent's Park College.
- ——— (2009). "Baptist Ministers as Leaders". In Lalleman, Pieter J. (ed.). Challenging to Change: Dialogues with a Radical Baptist Theologian - Essays presented to Dr Nigel G. Wright on his sixtieth birthday. London: Spurgeon’s College. ISBN 9780950068237. OCLC 700526743.
- ——— (2012). "Play up! Play up! And play the game: cricket and our place in the world". In Finamore, Stephen; Weaver, John (eds.). Wisdom, Science and the Scriptures: Essays in Honour of Ernest Lucas. Bristol: Regents Park College. pp. 243–62.
- ——— (2016). "Film Noir and the Bible". In Burnette-Bletsch, Rhonda (ed.). The Bible in Motion: A Handbook of the Bible and its Reception in Film. Boston, MA: De Gruyter.
- ——— (2017). "Help us to search for Truth: Baptists and Doing Theology". In Blyth, Myra; Goodliff, Andy (eds.). Gathering Disciples: Essays in Honour of Christopher Ellis. Eugene OR: Pickwick. pp. 1–25. ISBN 9781498231572.

=== Articles in journals ===
- ——— (October 1981). "From Hegel to Whitehead". The Journal of Religion. 61 (4): 403–421. doi:10.1086/486891. JSTOR 1202837. S2CID 170809016.
- ——— (January 1982). "How Relative Should Theology Be?". Baptist Quarterly. 29 (5).
- ——— (January 1985). "God's Adventure of Love: an introduction to some leading ideas of Process Theology, and their pastoral implications". The Fraternal.
- ——— (April 1987). "God and History: an essay on the interface of theological and historical methods". Baptist Quarterly.
- ——— (1989). "God and Action". Religious Studies. 24 (4): 463–481. doi:10.1017/S0034412500019557. JSTOR 20019305. S2CID 170185539.
- ——— (1990). "The Vulnerability of Action". Religious Studies. 25 (2): 225–233. doi:10.1017/S0034412500001839. JSTOR 20019342. S2CID 170179021.
- ——— (May 1992). "Preaching Christ Crucified". Epworth Review.
- ——— (April 1999). "Gathered at the Table: Reflections on the Lord's Supper". Baptist Ministers' Journal.
- ——— (July 2000). "On a journey of the Spirit". Baptist Ministers' Journal.
- ——— (June 2001). "Movies and Meaning – an introduction to theology in secular film". Expository Times.
- ——— (2005). "Geoffrey Studdert Kennedy: The Pastor and the suffering God". Transformation. 22 (3): 166–175. doi:10.1177/026537880502200306. JSTOR 43052917. S2CID 171224692.
- ——— (2007). "And the Life Everlasting: A Theological Reflection on Death and Dying". Transformation. 24 (2): 86–94. doi:10.1177/026537880702400204. JSTOR 43052696. S2CID 142162946.
- ——— (2009). "Bringing out the Meaning: Deacy, Nolan, Scorsese and what films "mean"". The Journal of Religion and Film. 13 (2).
- ——— (2012). "Faster, Higher, Stronger: – Sport and the point of it all". Anvil. 28 (1).
- ——— (2012). "The meanings of sport: an empirical study into the significance attached to sporting participation and spectating in the UK and US". Practical Theology. 5 (2).
- ——— (Autumn 2015). "The Church as Praying Community". International Congregational Journal. 14 (2).

== Sources ==
- The Georgetonian 6 April 2005
- Oxford University Theology Faculty
- British Baptist Theologians: Robert Ellis

Academic offices
Preceded by Paul Fiddes	Principal of Regent's Park College, Oxford; 2007–2021	Succeeded by Sir Malcolm Evans
