= Blackfriars Hall =

Permanent private hall of the University of Oxford

- University of Oxford
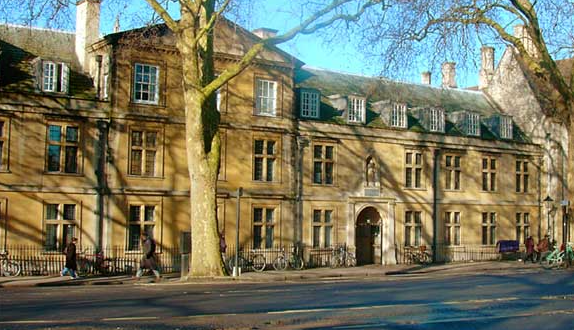

- Arms: Gyronny sable and argent, a cross flory counterchanged.
- Location: St Giles', Oxford
- Established: 1994
- Named after: The black cappa of the Dominican friars
- Regent: Rev. John O’Connor, OP
- Undergraduates: 0 (4 visiting students)
- Postgraduates: 50
- Website: Hall website

Blackfriars Hall is a Roman Catholic permanent private hall of the University of Oxford. Unlike a college, a hall is owned and governed by an outside institution (in this case, the English Province of the Order of Preachers) and not by its fellows or independent trustees. Although historically a centre for the study of theology and philosophy informed by the intellectual tradition of St Thomas Aquinas, it now admits men and women of any faith to a wide range of postgraduate degree programmes in the humanities and social sciences. The current Regent of Blackfriars is Fr. John O'Connor, O.P.

== Overview ==
Blackfriars Hall is the home of a number of research institutes, including the Las Casas Institute on ethics, governance and social justice, named for Bartolomé de las Casas. Launched in November 2008, the institute contributes to the hall's founding vision to be a centre of the social as well as the sacred sciences. Its founding director was Francis Davis (2008–2011); As of 2026 the director is Hugo Slim.

The Aquinas Institute was established in 2004 under the directorship of the late Fergus Kerr OP. It aims to foster study of St Thomas at Oxford through seminars, conferences, summer schools and programmes. Patrons of the institute include John Haldane, Alasdair MacIntyre and Eleonore Stump.

A Centre for Theology and the Performing Arts was launched in 2026.

== Profile ==
Blackfriars Hall describes itself as "small, friendly and welcoming environment for intellectual encounter". Blackfriars is unique in the Oxford environment for its smallness and specialist focus. The Hall is growing smaller as enrolment has fallen from 55 in 2022 to 20 in 2024. As a result, student numbers fell from 86 in 2024 to 50 in 2025. Blackfriars claims that this allows the friars to provide a personal service where "students are known by name, not only by other students, but also by the staff."

In response to a 2022 Freedom of Information Request the Hall reported that it has no full-time employees.

The relationship between the Dominican friars and the Hall is very close. Friars always make up the majority of the Hall governing body (known as Moderators). Blackfriars Hall occupies the buildings owned and inhabited by Dominican friars. The friars financially subsidise the working of the Hall. Blackfriars Formal Halls are "substantially subsidised by the community of Friars [...] catering team services for the formals are offered directly by the Friars as a service to the community, at no additional cost to Blackfriars Hall."

== Development ==
In 2018 Blackfriars invested £1.5 million converting a disused Bank into additional facilities, including four student bedrooms, offices for various academic departments and seminar rooms. The project was necessary due to "lack of space and logistical constraints" in the Priory building. It was intended to enable the student and religious "communities can live alongside each other within the limited space". In particular "pressure on space has been felt" "especially by friars who live here and need space of their own for prayer, study and relaxation." The first students moved into purpose built accessible accommodation in 2019.

Like many similar colleges Blackfriars was very severely impacted by the Covid pandemic. Reporting financial "harm being suffered at the current time by Blackfriars Hall" a 'Fighting Fund' was launched raising £25k from alumni and others. A further £62.5k was raised in 2021 placing the Hall back on secure financial footings.

In 2023 the Hall announced a second phase of redevelopment to the former bank building. Moving academic offices to their former location in the Priory, the Hall announced plans to rent space for a profit making cafe "The Good Habit" on the ground floor, due to start its trading in September 2024. This would provide a steady income for the Hall and to meet an "urgent need for dining space for students".. Construction work for the cafe began in June 2026 after a two year delay.

== People associated with Blackfriars ==
=== Notable former students ===
- Joseph William Tobin, C.Ss.R., Cardinal prelate and Archbishop of the Roman Catholic Archdiocese of Newark
- Anthony Fisher OP, 9th Roman Catholic Archbishop of Sydney
- Delia Gallagher, journalist, CNN Faith and Values Correspondent

=== Fellows and academics ===
- John Battle - former MP for Leeds West
- Brian Davies OP - philosopher and former Regent
- Richard Finn OP - former Regent
- Cardinal Radcliffe - Master of the Order of Preachers from 1992 to 2001, Cardinal Deacon of the Holy Roman Church.
- Fergus Kerr OP - Regent (1998–2004)
- James MacMillan - classical composer and conductor, Honorary Fellow
- John Loughlin - Emeritus Fellow of St Edmund's College, Cambridge

== Gallery ==
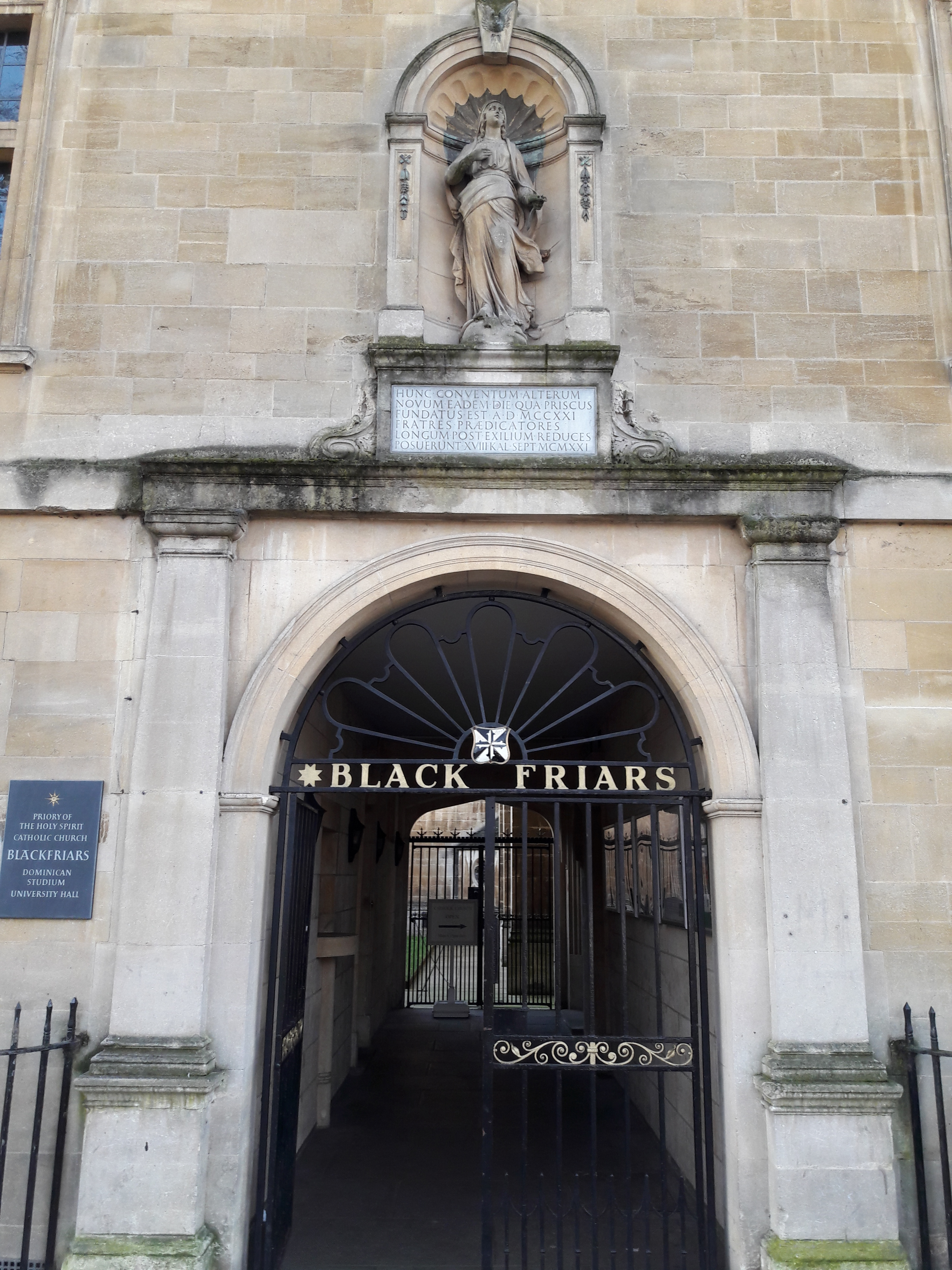
Entrance gate to Blackfriars surmounted by a statue of the Virgin Mary and inscription by Eric Gill

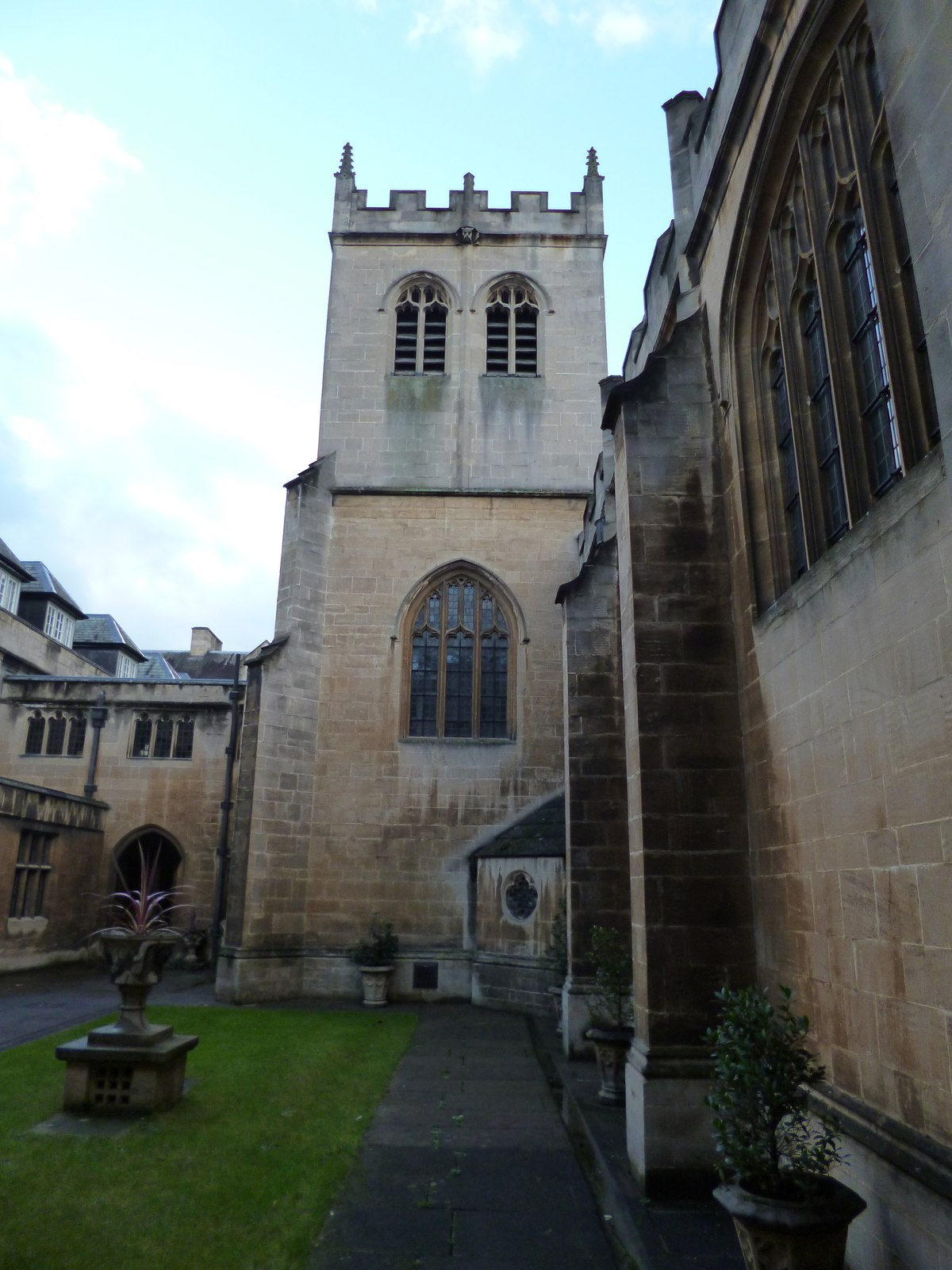
Courtyard and bell tower (not accessible to students)

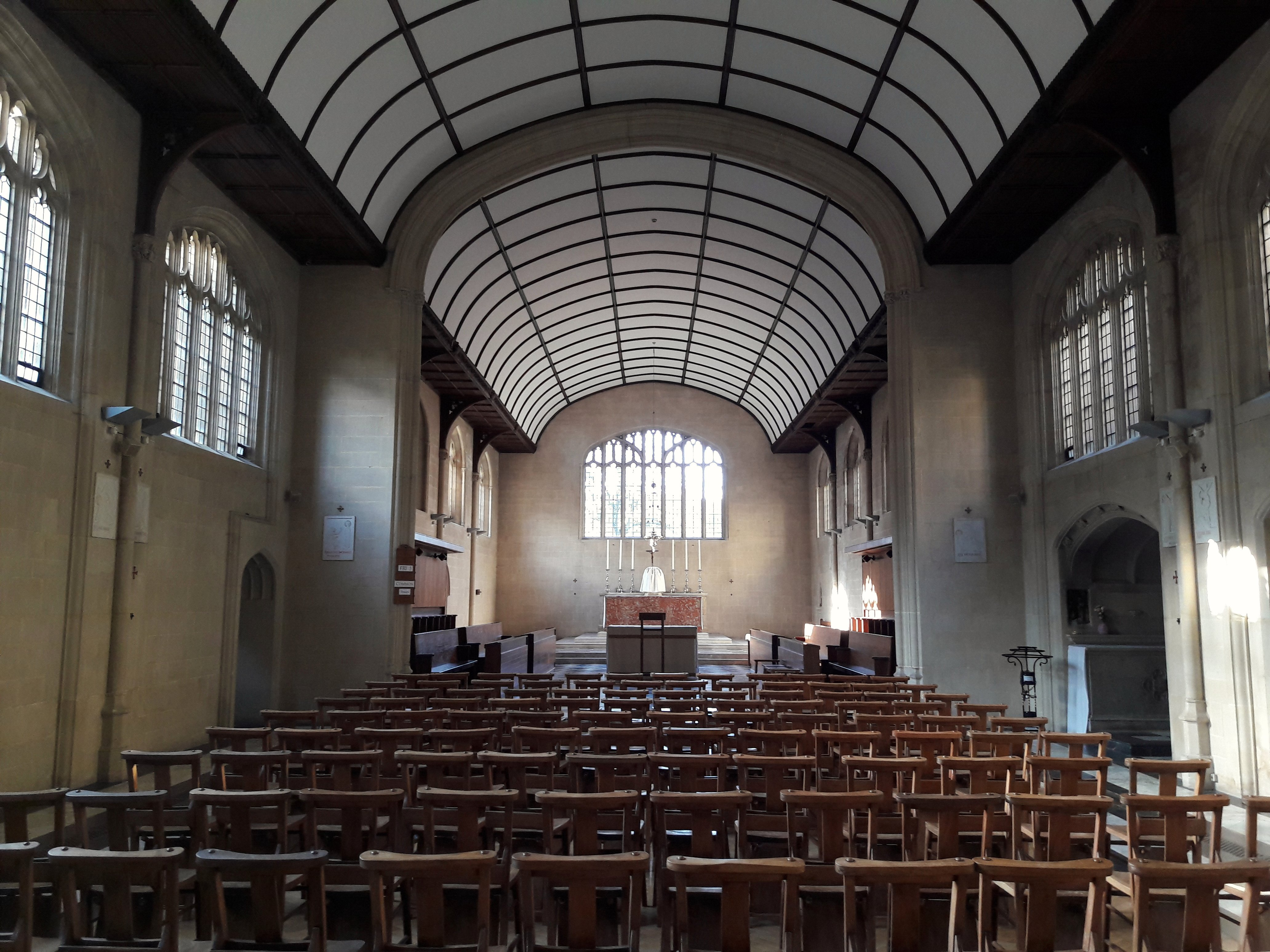
Blackfriars public chapel

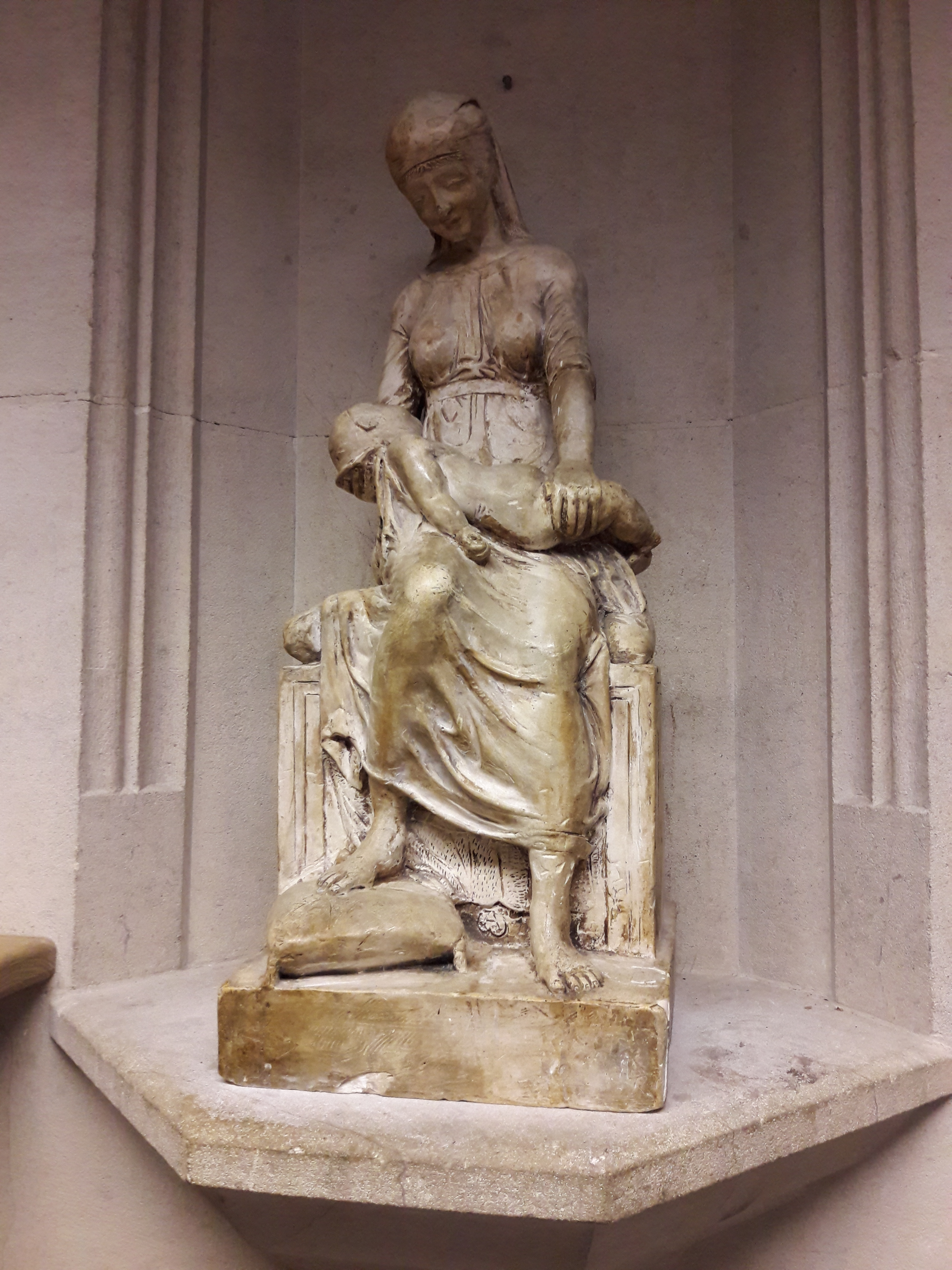
Alabaster statue of the virgin in the college chapel
