= Permanent private hall =

Educational institution within the University of Oxford

A permanent private hall (PPH) in the University of Oxford is an educational institution within the University. There are four permanent private halls at Oxford, three of which admit undergraduates. They were founded by different Christian denominations.

Students at PPHs are members of the University of Oxford and have full access to the University's facilities and activities.

== Overview ==
Regent's Park College is the largest PPH and is, to all intents and purposes, a small college specialising in the Arts, Humanities and Social Sciences with a total student body of c. 200. Regent's also trains Baptist ministerial students. Since 1919, Regent's has admitted both men and women. Blackfriars Hall, and Wycliffe Hall were all male-only institutions historically, but both are now co-educational, training ordinands for their respective denominations, and also admitting students for a range of other courses of study. Campion Hall admits graduate students in Humanities and Social Science subjects, and occasionally in other disciplines.

== History ==
=== Private halls ===
The Oxford University Act 1854 and the university statute De aulis privatis (On private Halls) of 1855 allowed any Master of Arts aged at least 28 years to open a private hall after obtaining a licence to do so. The longest lived of the thirteen private halls was Charsley's Hall (1862–1891). Notable masters of private halls included William Edward Addis and George Butler.

The Universities Tests Act 1871 opened all university degrees and positions to men who were not members of the Church of England (subject to safeguards for religious instruction and worship), which made it possible for Roman Catholics and Nonconformists to open private halls. These non-Anglican private halls included Clarke's Hall (now Campion Hall), opened by the Jesuit Order in 1896, and Hunter Blair's Hall (later St Benet's Hall) opened by the Benedictine Order in 1899.

=== Permanent private halls ===
In 1918 the university passed a statute to allow private halls which were not run for profit to become permanent private halls and the two halls took new names.

In some cases, a PPH can be granted full collegiate status; recent examples include St Peter's College (became a full college in 1961), Mansfield College (became a full college in 1995) and Harris Manchester College (became a full college in 1996).

Greyfriars (1224; refounded 1910) closed in 2008. St Benet's Hall closed in 2022. Students from both Greyfriars and St Benets Hall were subsumed into Regent's Park College when their halls closed. St Stephen's House became a permanent private hall in 2003, and ceased to be one in September 2023, but continued to be an Anglican theological college.

== List of permanent private halls ==
Name	Founded	PPH status since	Association	Undergraduates	Graduates	Visiting students	Total students	Undergraduate degree subjects
Blackfriars Hall (website)	1221; refounded 1921	1994	Roman Catholic (Dominican)	4	39	9	52	PPE, Philosophy and Theology, Theology
Campion Hall (website)	1896	1918	Roman Catholic (Jesuit)	0	9	0	9	—
Regent's Park College (website)	1810	1957	Baptist Union of Great Britain	115	70	16	201	Classical Archaeology and Ancient History, Classics, Classics and English, English, Geography, History, History and Politics, Law, Philosophy and Theology, PPE, Theology
Wycliffe Hall (website)	1877	1996	Church of England (Evangelical)	77	27	55	159	Philosophy and Theology, Theology

== Former permanent private halls ==
Name	Founded	PPH status from	Association	Current status
St Peter's Hall	1929	1929	Church of England	Became a new foundation 1947, full college 1961
Mansfield College	1886	1955	Nonconformist (Congregational/United Reformed Church)	Became a full college 1995
Manchester College	1889	1990	Nonconformist (Unitarian)	Became a full college 1996
Greyfriars	1224; refounded 1910	1957	Roman Catholic (Franciscan)	Closed 2008
St Benet's Hall	1897	1918	Roman Catholic (Benedictine)	Closed 2022
St Stephen's House	1876	2003	Church of England (Anglo-Catholic)	Remains a theological college from 2023

== See also ==
- Cambridge Theological Federation
