= New Park Street Chapel =

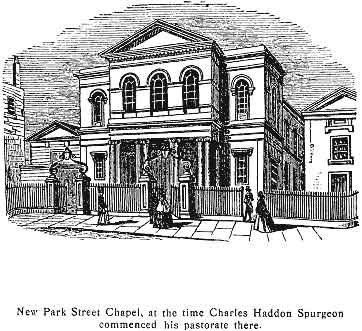
- New Park Street Chapel, c. 1854
- Location: Southwark, London
- Country: England
- Denomination: Baptist

History
- Founded: 1650

The New Park Street Chapel, nowadays Metropolitan Tabernacle, was a Particular Baptist chapel in Southwark, London, built in 1833. The church was formed in 1650 and initially was General Baptist. Its first pastor was William Rider, and many notable others have filled the position since, including Benjamin Keach, Dr. John Gill, Dr. John Rippon, and C. H. Spurgeon. In 1861, the church moved to Elephant and Castle and was renamed Metropolitan Tabernacle.

== History ==
From 1650, when the English Parliament banned Nonconformist Puritan organizations from conducting services, the church braved persecution until 1688, when the Baptists were once again allowed to worship in freedom. At this point, the group built their first chapel, in the Tower Bridge area.

In 1720, Dr. John Gill became pastor and served for 51 years. In 1773, Dr. John Rippon became pastor and served for 63 years. During these times, the church experienced great growth and became one of the largest congregations in the country. The congregation moved to New Park Street from the Baptist meeting-house in Carter Lane, Tooley Street in 1833. The New Park Street chapel could seat 1200 people.

In 1854, Charles Haddon Spurgeon became pastor, and he quickly became the most popular British preacher of his day. The church soon became so full that services had to be held in hired halls such as the Surrey Music Hall.

During Spurgeon's ministry, it was decided that the church should be expanded to accommodate the overflowing crowds who sat in window sills and lined up outside. In 1856 the expansion removed the wall behind the pulpit and allowed for about 200 more seats. As this was still not enough room the elders decided to move permanently to a larger premises. The location chosen was the Elephant & Castle, a very prominent location near the River Thames in South London, partly because it was thought to be the site of the burning of the Southwark Martyrs. The church was finished in 1861, renamed Metropolitan Tabernacle, and dedicated on March 18.

== Notable ministers ==
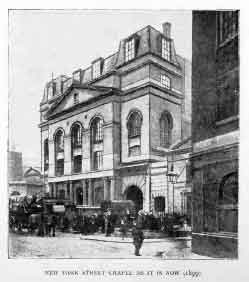
New Park Street Chapel after Spurgeon's expansion

- Benjamin Keach, 1668–1704
- John Gill, 1720–71
- John Rippon, 1773–1836
- Joseph Angus, 1837–39
- Charles Spurgeon, 1854–92
- Arthur Tappan Pierson 1891–93
- Thomas Spurgeon, 1893–1908
- Archibald G. Brown, 1908–11
- Amzi Dixon, 1911–19
- Peter Masters, from 1970
