= History of Regent's Park College, Oxford =

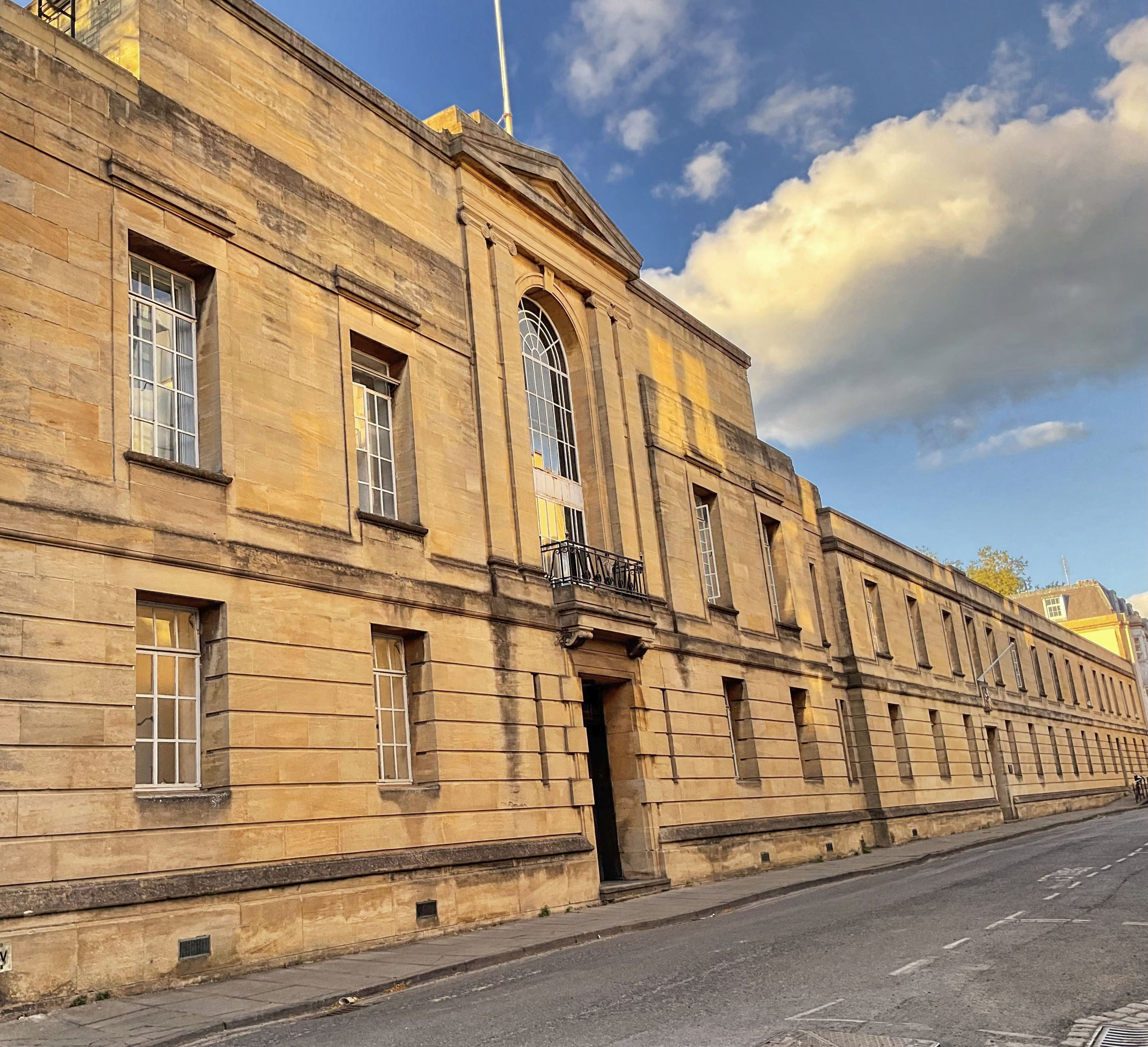
Regent's Park College, Oxford

Regent's Park College dates to the foundation of the London Baptist Education Society in 1752. The appointment of the first Principal came in 1810 when the college moved to Stepney, East London. In 1855, under the then-president, Dr Joseph Angus, the college moved to Holford House in the centre of Regent's Park, where it operated as a Constituent College of the University of London. In 1927, the college moved to Oxford, with the first students arriving in 1928, and matriculating under name of the then St Catherine's Society, later St Catherine's College, Oxford. After taking advantage of links with both St Catherine's Society and Mansfield College, Oxford, to matriculate undergraduates for study within the university, the college became a permanent private hall of the University of Oxford in 1957.

== Origins in Stepney, East London ==
Regent's Park College traces its roots to the formation of the London Baptist Education Society in 1752. The Baptist Education Society was founded around 1804 by Abraham Booth and others. This venture led to the development of the Baptist College, Stepney, a Dissenting Academy in East London in 1810. At the time only members of the Church of England could take degrees at ancient universities. It was not until the Oxford University Act 1854 that Baptists and other dissenters were admitted to the University of Oxford. In 1810 there were only three students, but by 1850 the number had risen to 26.

The premises at Stepney consisted of two large houses near Whitechapel Road. Between them was King John's Tower. This structure, which can still be seen in the present Regent's Park College crest, is believed to be all that remained of a royal suburban lodge. The Anti-Slavery agitator Rev. Dr William Harris Murch served as Principal from 1827 to 1843. In 1849, Dr Joseph Angus (Principal 1849–1893) became Principal at just 33 years old. At the beginning of his time as Principal, Angus admitted a small number of lay students to college. His belief was that it would benefit the ministerial students to have contact with them as well as bringing much needed finances to the academy.

== Move to Regent's Park ==
After sites in Gordon Square and Primrose Hill were considered, on 12 December 1855 Angus decided to relocate the college to Holford House in the rural environs of Regent's Park and to rename the academy ‘Regent’s Park College’. Holford House was a private dwelling built in the classical Georgian style on crown land. Students were able to read for university degrees in the Arts and Law, as well as training for Christian ministry.

In 1856, anxious to ensure the college had a high academic standing, he sought to move closer to University College London in order that closer links could be fostered with the University of London. From this point onwards the relationship with the University of London, which began as early as 1841, began to develop and for the first time Baptist ministerial students were able to associate closely with the University of London. According to Angus the links with the university drove up standards of scholarship in the college. In 1901, the college became an official Divinity School of the University of London.

In 1919, Violet Hedger became the first woman to train for Baptist ministry at RPC.

In 1920, G. P. Gould (1896–1920) passed on to H. Wheeler Robinson the role of Principal, a post he would hold until 1942. Wheeler Robinson was educated at Regent's Park College for one session; he then went to Edinburgh University and finally to Mansfield College, Oxford. Wheeler Robinson believed that Oxford was a more congenial setting than London for a college. This belief, coupled with the lure of the advantages of the tutorial system and the fact that the Baptist Church remained the only Free Church denomination without a college in one of the ancient universities, led Wheeler Robinson to decide to relocate the college to Oxford.

== The current college and its buildings ==
Principal's Lodge, c.1905.

In 1926, a site became available which Wheeler-Robinson saw as an opportunity “too precious to be lost”. In 1927, the main portion of the site was purchased and the buildings, including various farm buildings and two wells, in Pusey Street were secured shortly afterwards from St John's College. The owner of the site was allegedly an Anglican, who nonetheless was willing to sell to Baptists as 'he was sure they would not re-sell to Roman Catholics!' The site as a whole cost just over £17,000. The college appointed T Harold Hughes (1897–1949) as the Architect for the site. Hughes was responsible for much extension and restoration work in Oxford including Exeter College, Hertford College and Corpus Christi College.

The first four students arrived in 1928. The site in Oxford was to be used along with the London premises for a further ten years. At this time many of the classes were held at Mansfield College and other lectures were held at various other colleges. However, as early as 1924 Wheeler Robinson started to promote his plans for a new building scheme on the Oxford site to former students. Between 1935 and 1938 he and E. A. Payne spoke at various meetings and raised £20,000 of the £50,000 needed for the project. The foundation stones for Helwys Hall were laid on 21 July 1938 by representatives from the Baptist Union of Great Britain and Ireland, The Particular Baptist Fund, The Baptist Missionary Society. Stones were also laid in memory of Angus and Gould, former Principals of the college. The building work was just finished by the time the Government placed restrictions on all private building works in 1940. During the Second World War the college housed the London School of Slavonic Studies and acted as a public air raid shelter. Students of Mansfield College, Oxford, with whom Regent's has always enjoyed a firm link, also used the college facilities whilst theirs were used for wartime purposes.

After WWII, an ambitious plan to create a new entranceway on to St Giles, on the location of the current Principal's Lodgings, had to be placed on hold, however, as it was discovered that parts of the Lodge dated from 1500 and that there may have been students of the university on the site as early as the 1300s.

=== Helwys Hall ===
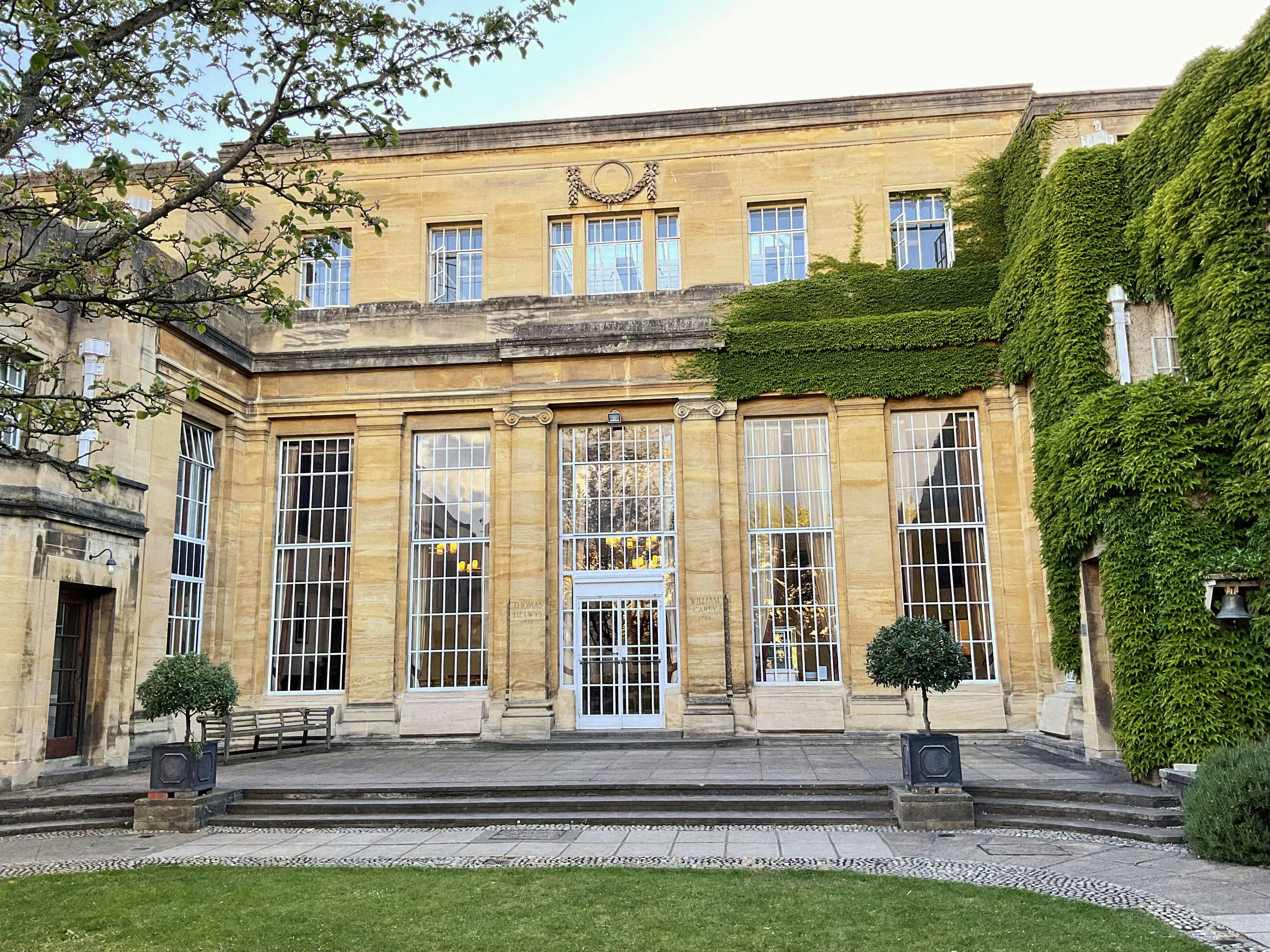
Helwys Hall

Helwys Hall, known affectionately by some in the undergraduate community as 'Hell Hall' or, more rarely, 'Hell Hole', is an imposing room with a very high ceiling clad in Canadian pine. Above the High Table there is a symbolic representation of the main emphases of Baptist life and faith designed by Dr H Wheeler Robinson (Principal 1920–1942). Helwys Hall is home to a series of portraits which, taken together, present a brief history of the college. Most of the former Principals' portraits are displayed including a recent portrait of Professor Paul Fiddes. There are also portraits of Joshua Marshman, Hannah Marshman, William Carey, and Willam Ward who were all missionaries to India and Andrew Fuller who was a missionary and first secretary of the Baptist Missionary Society. Helwys Hall was completely renovated in 2009 with a gift to the Annual Fund from an anonymous donor.

The Senior Common Room

The Senior Common Room (SCR), which is used by academic and administrative staff, was provided by a gift from the nieces and nephews of Dr George Pearce Gould (Principal 1896–1920). One of the striking features of the room is the portrait of Dr. Gould which hangs over an Adams brothers mantelpiece. Facing Gould is a portrait of William Kiffin which dates back to 1667. The SCR was refurbished in 2008 using gifts to the college's Annual Fund from the American Friends of Regent's Park College.

The Staircase

The Staircase which leads from the doors of Helwys Hall up to the library was designed by Hughes and attempts to express the effect that reading Dr Pearce Carey's life of William Carey had upon him. The balustrade exhibits strength, simplicity and an out-flowing floral design which recall Carey's life and work. Each landing has a striking 1930s window which looks out over the gardens of St Cross College.

The College Library

The College Library is on the third floor of the college above Helwys Hall, and houses many key works relating to theology, as well as many works on history, geography and politics. It is furnished with dark wood and contains graduate study rooms as well as a number of computers.

In the library there is a semi-circular window with sixteen panels, on which is etched a map of the world with many interesting symbols and emblems. The window came from the Glasgow Empire Exhibition of 1937 and is a fine example of modern glass work. The library contains portraits of both William Carey and John Bunyan, and outside it hangs a portrait of Henry Havelock.

The Collier Room

The Collier Room was provided by a gift from Mr H. H. Collier who was a member of College Council for many years and the one who conducted the negotiations for the purchase of the site. The room was refurbished in 2010 using a gift to the college's Annual Fund from The American Friends of Regent's Park College and Bloomsbury Central Baptist Church.

The Craig Knight Room

The Craig Knight room is a seminar room which seats 16 people. The room is named after Craig F. Knight, an alumnus of the college who was invested as the college's first member of the Vice Chancellor's Circle in 2008.

=== The Angus Library and Archive ===
The Angus Library and Archive is a scholarship library holding many volumes and documents which are critical to the understanding of Baptist history and culture, many of which cannot be found anywhere else in the world. It is based on the site of the college. The core of the collection was left to Regent's Park College by Dr. Joseph Angus who was Principal from 1849 to 1893. The Angus now comprises over 70,000 printed books, pamphlets, journals, church and association records, church histories, manuscript letters and other artifacts from the late fifteenth century to the present day. The collection relates to the life and history of Baptists in Britain and the wider world. Alongside this unique insight into Baptist and nonconformist history there is a considerable amount of material from non-Baptist sources relating to issues and controversies in which Baptists were involved.

The Angus Library and Archive is used by international scholars researching Baptist history, the history of Dissent in the UK, the social history of foreign missions and linguistics. It is also used by members of the public researching, among other things, the history of their families or local communities. Each year there are in the region of 1000 requests for information from outside the University of Oxford. The people involved in research come from a variety of countries including the US, Australia, China, India, the Caribbean and Europe.

The Junior Common Room

The JCR is a large oak paneled room which is adorned with the pictures of Regent's many sports teams. The room also has a JCR presidents' board with the name of every JCR president and a board recording all Regent's students who have received a Blue from the university. When heads of houses and bursars made a recent inspection of all the Junior Common Rooms in Oxford it was agreed that Regent's' recently refurbished, wood-panelled common room is one of the finest there is.

Other Buildings

The college also owns seventeenth- and eighteenth-century houses which face out onto St. Giles' as well as more recent developments, such as Wheeler Robinson House, which is used for third year accommodation, and Gould House and Angus House, both of which are used either for undergraduates or tutors. All accommodation is on-site, or less than a three-minute walk away from the main college buildings.

== College timeline ==
- 1938–1940

Main Block was constructed, consisting of 16 study bedrooms, along with Helwys Hall, the College Library, the Senior Common Room and part of the building on Pusey Street.

- 1957

Regent's Park College became a permanent private hall of the University of Oxford. From this point on the college underwent dramatic change under the leadership of its eleventh Principal, Gwynne Henton Davies (1958–1972). During this period the college once again started to accept non-ministerial undergraduates and new buildings were erected to accommodate the college's growing size. Since then, the student body has grown to include around 110 undergraduate students and 50 graduates, as well as ministerial students.

- 1958

Reconstruction and remodelling of the east end of the quad and back of 55 St Giles.

- 1961

Balding student accommodation block built, and longest single pane of glass in Europe fitted.

- 1966–1968

Further developments to the South side (Pusey Street) which completes the quad.

- 1977

Angus student accommodation block built.

- 1985

Wheeler Robinson House (on the corner of St Giles and Pusey Street) built.

- 2008

When Greyfriars closed in 2008 the remaining 30 students joined Regent's Park College.

== See also ==
- Regent's Park College, Oxford
- Regent's Park College Boat Club
- Permanent private halls of the University of Oxford
- List of dissenting academies (19th century)
