= Keach =

Keach is the surname of the following people:

- Benjamin Keach (1640–1704), English Baptist preacher and author
  - Keach's Catechism
- James Keach (born 1947), American actor, producer, and director
- Scott Keach (born 1965), Australian equestrian
- Stacy Keach Jr. (1941–2026), American actor, brother of James
- Stacy Keach Sr. (1914–2003), American actor, father of James and Stacy Jr.
