= Metropolitan Tabernacle =

Church in Elephant and Castle, London, England

Coordinates: 51°29′39″N 0°6′4″W

- Metropolitan Tabernacle Baptist Church
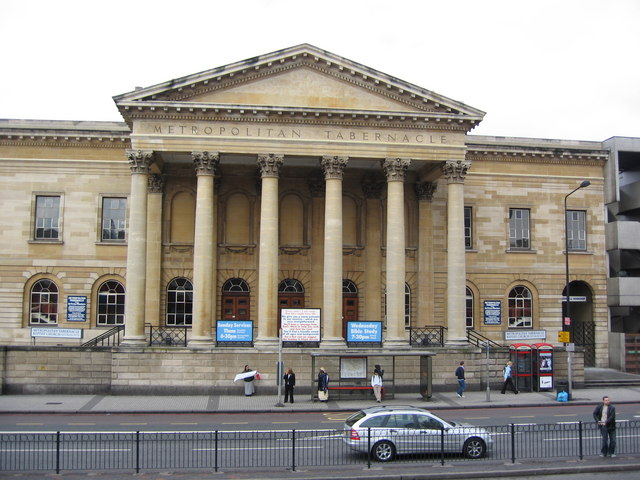
- Metropolitan Tabernacle
- Location: Elephant and Castle, London
- Country: England
- Denomination: Independent Reformed Baptist
- Website: metropolitantabernacle.org

History
- Founded: 1650
- Founder: William Rider

Clergy
- Pastor: Peter Masters

The Metropolitan Tabernacle Baptist Church, shortly the Metropolitan Tabernacle, is an Independent Reformed Baptist church in the Elephant and Castle area in London. Formed in 1650, it was the largest non-conformist church of its day in 1861. Its first pastor was William Rider; other notable pastors and preachers include Benjamin Keach, John Gill, John Rippon and C. H. Spurgeon. The present pastor is Peter Masters.

== History ==
The Metropolitan Tabernacle Baptist Church originated in 1650, when the Parliament of England banned Nonconformist Puritan churches from conducting their services. William Rider, a Puritan General Baptist leader, became the first minister and later, under Benjamin Keach's pastorate, the congregation became Particular Baptist. The church was subject to persecution until 1688, when the Baptists were once again allowed to worship freely. At this point, the first chapel was built in Horsleydown, Southwark, an area of London immediately south of the present-day Tower Bridge.

In 1720, John Gill became pastor and served for 51 years. In 1771, John Rippon became pastor and served for 63 years. During these times, the church experienced growth and became one of the largest congregations in the country. Afterwards decline set in and by 1850 the congregation was small.

In 1854, Charles Haddon Spurgeon started serving at the church at the age of 20. The church at the beginning of Spurgeon's pastorate was situated at New Park Street, and was known as New Park Street Chapel. Soon, the church became so full that services had to be held in hired halls such as the Surrey Gardens Music Hall.

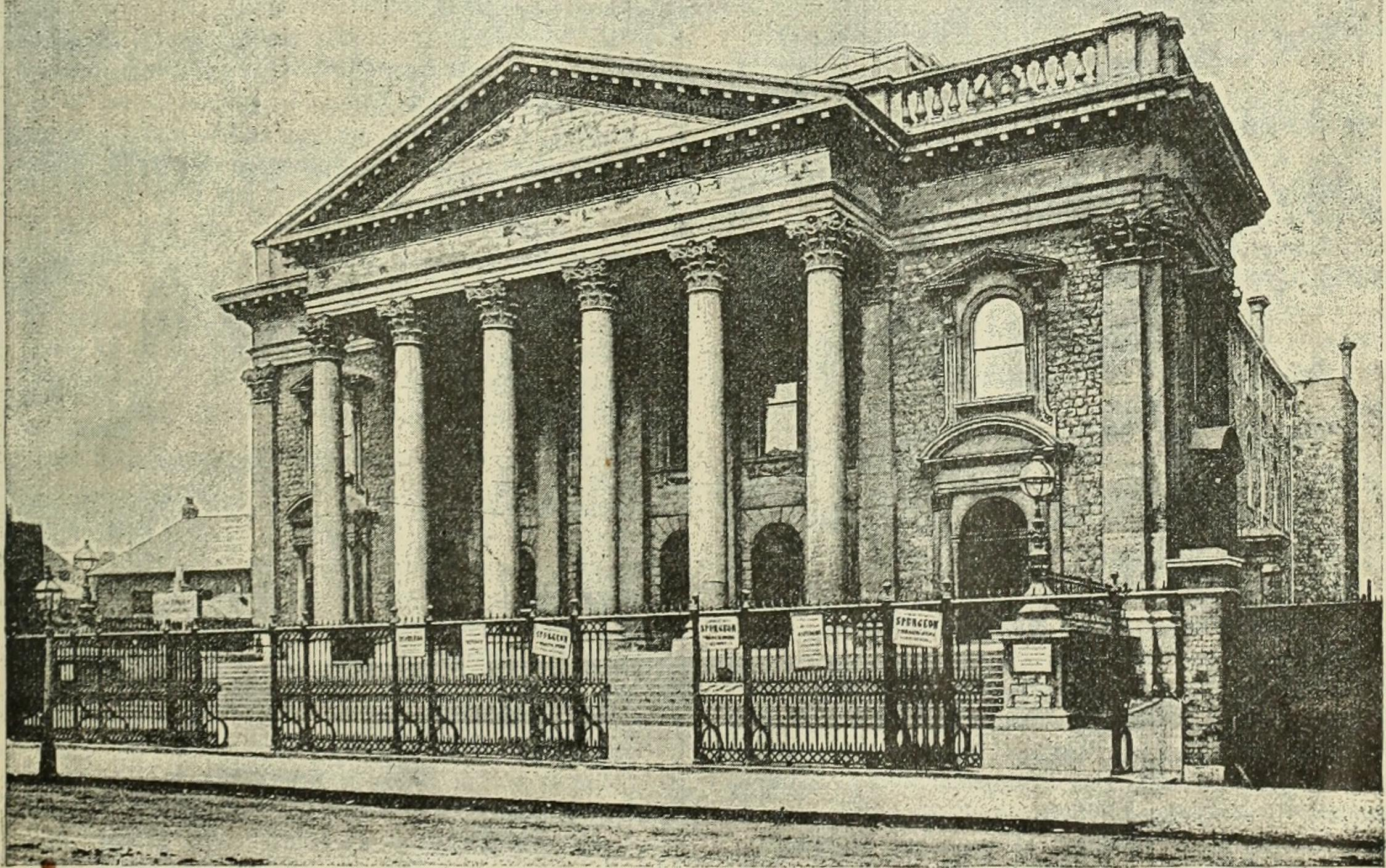
Metropolitan Tabernacle in 1890

During Spurgeon's ministry, it was decided that the church should move permanently to larger premises. The location chosen was at Elephant and Castle, a prominent position near the River Thames in South London, partly because it was thought to be the site of the burning of the Southwark Martyrs. The building, with a 6,000-seat auditorium, designed by William Willmer Pocock, was finished in 1861 and dedicated on 18 March. In 1881, the church had 5,500 members.

Spurgeon also founded a college for preachers and church workers (now Spurgeon's College), and orphanages for girls and boys.

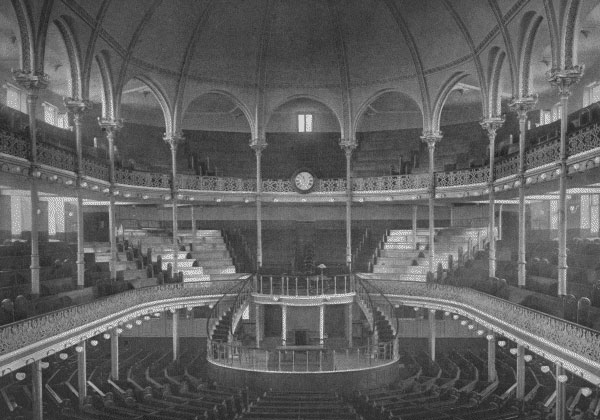
Interior of the original Metropolitan Tabernacle

In 1887, the church seceded from the Baptist Union because of the widening influence of theological liberalism within the organization. Spurgeon was adamant that the church would not "downgrade" the faith, as he believed other Baptist churches were doing.

At the end of 1891, membership was given as 5,311. Spurgeon served for 38 years and died in 1892.

The original building was burned down in 1898, leaving just the front portico and basement intact, before the rebuilt church was destroyed again in 1941 during the German bombing of London in World War II. Once again, the portico and basement survived and in 1957 the Tabernacle was rebuilt to a new but much smaller design incorporating surviving original features.

The War led to the Metropolitan Tabernacle being greatly diminished as few members of the old congregation were able to return to heavily blitzed central London. It rejoined the Baptist Union of Great Britain in 1955. By 1970, the church had fallen to the point where it occupied only a few pews. It seceded from the Baptist Union again on 22 February 1971, just after Peter Masters became the pastor, over the same appointed reasons under Spurgeon in 1887. It hosts an annual school of theology, runs a part-time seminary for pastors, has five Sunday schools, and provides free video and audio downloads, along with live-streaming of services. By 2009, it would have 500 people in its main service, and by 2024 the church would be completely full, with overflow rooms and livestreams relaying the service.

== Notable pastors ==
- Benjamin Keach, 1668–1704
- John Gill, 1720–71
- John Rippon, 1773–1836
- Joseph Angus, 1837–39
- Charles Spurgeon, 1854–92
- Thomas Spurgeon, 1893–1908
- Archibald G. Brown, 1908–11
- Amzi Dixon, 1911–19
- Peter Masters, 1970–present.

== See also ==
- List of the largest evangelical churches
- List of the largest evangelical church auditoriums

== Bibliography ==
- Austin, Alvyn (2007), China's Millions: The China Inland Mission and Late Qing Society, Grand Rapids, MI: Eerdmans, ISBN 978-0-8028-2975-7.
