= David Russen =

English author (c.1705–??)

- Occupation: Author

David Russen (fl. 1705) was an English author.

== Biography ==
In 1702, Russen was lived in Hythe, Kent. In 1703 he published ‘Iter Lunare; or a Voyage to the Moon.’ It was reissued in 1707. The book consists of a detailed account and criticism of Cyrano Bergerac's ‘Selenarchia,’ which Russen had read ‘with abundance of delight’ in the English version by Thomas St. Sere. He holds Bergerac's view that the moon was inhabited, and proposed to ascend to the moon by means of ‘a spring of well-tempered steel fastened to the top of a high mountain, having attached to it a frame or seat, the spring being with cords, pullies, or other engines bent, and then let loose by degrees by those who manage the pullies.’ The moon must be at the time of ascent ‘in the full in Cancer, and the engine must be so order'd in its ascent that that the top thereof must touch the moon when she comes to the meridian.’ The moon's motion must be exactly calculated to prevent the rotation of the earth carrying away the engine, and the distance from the top of the mountain exactly known. Russen opines it ‘possible in nature to effect such a spring, though 'tis a query if art will not be defective.’

Russen also published ‘Fundamentals without a Foundation, or a True Picture of the Anabaptists in their Rise, Progress, and Practice’ (1698?). There is no copy in the British Museum Library. A reply by Joseph Stennett appeared about 1699, and was reprinted in 1704. Russen made insinuations against the private character of Benjamin Keach, the Baptist preacher. A rejoinder to Stennett by James Barry, published in 1699, was reprinted in 1848.
