= Angus Library and Archive =

Coordinates: 51.7573°N 1.2610°W

Angus Library
- Type: University of Oxford Collegiate Library
- Established: 1893

Collection
- Size: 70,000 items
- Criteria for collection: Baptist Heritage

Other information
- Website: theangus.rpc.ox.ac.uk

The Angus Library and Archive is a collection of over 70,000 items relating to the history of the Baptist movement from 1612. It is based on the site of Regent's Park College, Oxford, a permanent private hall of the University of Oxford and one of the key centres for Baptist ministerial training worldwide.

== History of the library ==
The core of the collection was left to Regent's Park College by Joseph Angus, who was its principal from 1849 to 1893. The Angus Library now comprises over 70,000 printed books, pamphlets, journals, church and association records, church histories, manuscript letters and other artefacts from the late fifteenth century to the present.

The collection relates to the life and history of Baptists in Britain and the wider world. There is a considerable amount of material from non-Baptist sources relating to issues and controversies in which Baptists were involved. There is also an extensive hymnody collection from various denominations and cultures. Many of the items are unique to the library.

== Contents and collections ==
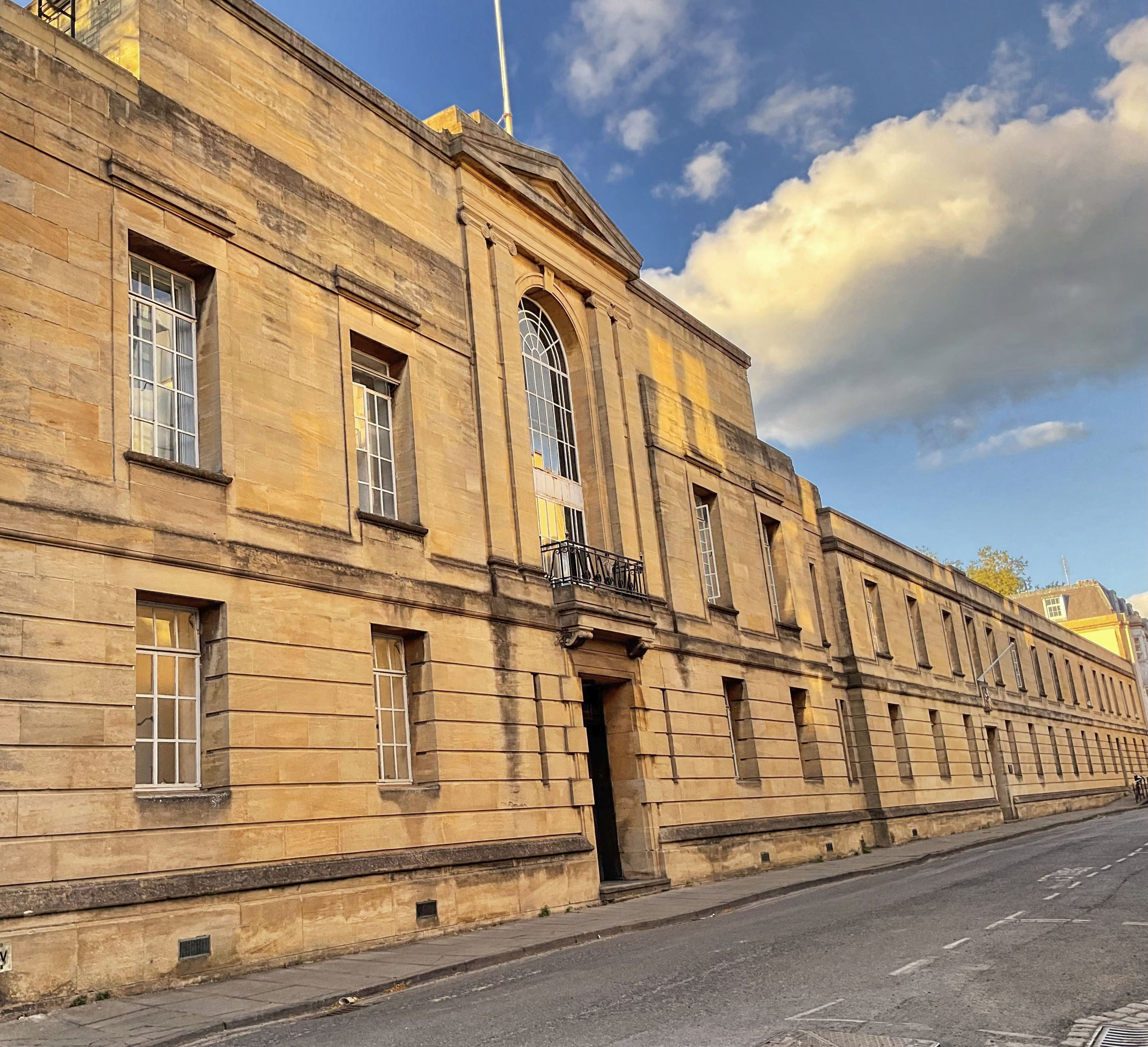
View of the exterior of Regent's Park College, Oxford

The library includes books, pamphlets, journals and letters. There is an international collection of Baptist periodicals. The manuscript collection has material relating to William Carey, C. H. Spurgeon, Joshua and Hannah Marshman, William Ward, E. A. Payne, and J. H. Rushbrook, and prominent Baptist families.

The Angus incorporates the former libraries and archives of:

- The Baptist Missionary Society (founded in 1792)
- The Baptist Union of Great Britain (founded in 1832)
- The Baptist Historical Society

Apart from the origins of the Baptist movement, the collection has special holdings relating to:

- The early colonies
- English sermons on the American War of Independence
- Jonathan Edwards and Fullerism
- Anglo-American relations
- Slavery and its abolition
- The founding of the modern missionary movement
- The Baptist World Alliance

The Angus Library and Archive is used by international scholars researching Baptist history, the history of Dissent in the UK, the social history of foreign missions and linguistics. It is also used by members of the public researching, among other things, the history of their families or local communities. Each year there are in the region of 1000 requests for information from outside the University of Oxford. The people involved in research come from a variety of countries including the US, Australia, China, India, the Caribbean and Europe.

== Lottery grant ==
The library secured, in late 2012, a £488,000 grant from the National Lottery and Baptist Union Newington Court Fund to extend and continue its work outside of the university.

== See also ==
- History of Regent's Park College, Oxford
