= John Gill (theologian) =

English theologian and minister (1697–1771)

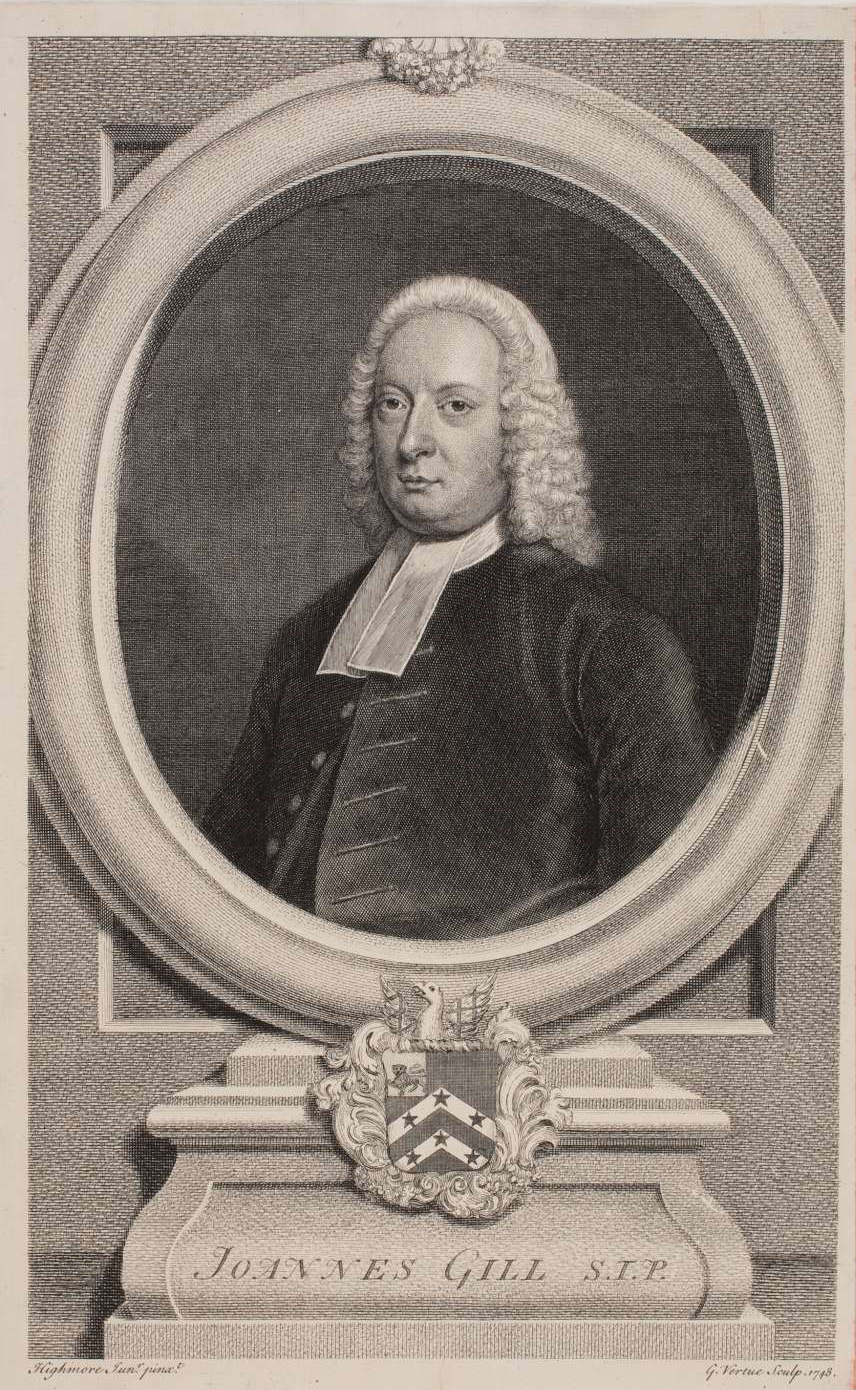
- Born: 23 November 1697
- Died: 14 October 1771 (aged 73)
- Education: University of Aberdeen (DD)

John Gill (23 November 1697 – 14 October 1771) was an English Particular Baptist theologian, Biblical scholar, and minister. He was born in Kettering, Northamptonshire, and attended Kettering Grammar School where he mastered the Latin classics and learned Greek by age 11. He was also an autodidact who taught himself logic and Hebrew.

== Early life ==
At the age of about 12, John Gill heard a sermon from his pastor, William Wallis, on the text, "And the LORD God called unto Adam, and said unto him, Where art thou?" (Genesis 3:9). The message stayed with Gill and eventually led to his conversion. It was not until seven years later that he was baptised.

== Pastoral work ==
Gill's first pastoral work was as an intern assisting John Davis at Higham Ferrers in 1718 at age 21. He became pastor at the Strict Baptist church at Goat Yard Chapel, Horsleydown, Southwark in 1719. His pastorate lasted 51 years. In 1757, his congregation needed larger premises and moved to a Carter Lane, St. Olave's Street, Southwark. This Baptist church was once pastored by Benjamin Keach and would later become the New Park Street Chapel and then the Metropolitan Tabernacle pastored by Charles Spurgeon. During Gill's ministry, the church strongly supported the preaching of George Whitefield at nearby Kennington Common.

== Various works ==
In 1748, Gill was awarded the honorary degree of Doctor of Divinity by the University of Aberdeen. He was a profound scholar and a prolific author. His most important works are:

- The Doctrine of the Trinity Stated and Vindicated (London, 1731)
- The Cause of God and Truth (4 parts, 1735–38), a retort to Daniel Whitby's Five Points
- An Exposition of the New Testament (3 vols., 1746–48), which with his Exposition of the Old Testament (6 vols., 1748–63) forms his magnum opus
- A Collection of Sermons and Tracts
- A Dissertation Concerning the Antiquity of the Hebrew Language, Letters, Vowel-Points, and Accents (1767)
- A Body of Doctrinal Divinity (1767)
- A Body of Practical Divinity (1770).

Gill also edited and re-published the works of the 'antinomian' theologian Tobias Crisp. He wrote a preface to the Hymns of Richard Davis and edited John Skepp’s book titled 'Divine Energy'. He signed the prefatory “epistle to the reader” of Herman Witsius' 'Oeconomy of the Covenants' together with John Brine.

== Significance ==
John Gill was the first major writing Baptist theologian, his work retaining influence into the 21st century. Gill's relationship with hyper-Calvinism in English Baptist life is a matter of debate. Peter Toon has argued that Gill was himself a hyper-Calvinist, which would make Gill the father of Baptist hyper-Calvinism. However, Tom Nettles and Timothy George have argued that Gill was not a hyper-Calvinist. Gill's works are still highly regarded by Primitive Baptists and related groups.

Gill staunchly defended the Five Points of Calvinism in his work The cause of God and truth. The work was a lengthy counter to contemporary Anglican Arminian Priest Daniel Whitby who had been attacking Calvinist doctrine. Gill goes to great lengths in quoting numerous Church Fathers in an attempt to show that the Five Points and other Calvinistic ideas were held in early Christianity.

== See also ==
- Hyper-Calvinism
- Primitive Baptist

== Sources ==
- Daniel, Curt. Hyper-Calvinism and John Gill. Unpublished Ph.D. dissertation, University of Edinburgh, 1983.
- Ella, George (1995). John Gill and the Cause of God and Truth. Eggleston, England: Go-Publications.
- Ella, George M. (17 August 2009). "John Gill and the Charge of Hyper-Calvinism". Biographia Evangelica. Archived from the original on 3 December 2019. First published by Baptist Quarterly, October, 1995.
- George, Timothy (1990). "John Gill". In George, T.; Dockery, D.S. (eds.). Baptist Theologians. Broadman Press. p. 77ff. ISBN 978-0-8054-6588-4.
- Murray, Iain H. Spurgeon v. Hyper-Calvinism: The Battle for Gospel Preaching. Banner of Truth, 2000. ISBN 0-85151-692-0
- Nettles, Thomas J. (1986). By His Grace and for His Glory: A Historical, Theological, and Practical Study of the Doctrines of Grace in Baptist Life. Grand Rapids, MI: Baker Books. ISBN 978-0-8010-6742-6.
- Oliver, Robert W. History of the English Calvinistic Baptists: 1771–1892. Banner of Truth, 2006. ISBN 0-85151-920-2
- Peter Toon, The Emergence of Hyper-Calvinism in English Nonconformity, 1689-1765. London: The Olive Tree, 1967.
- Rippon, John (1838). Brief Memoir of the Life and Writings of the Reverend John Gill. Reprint: Hess Publications, 1998. ISBN 0-87377-920-7

Religious titles
Preceded by Benjamin Stinton	Pastor of the New Park Street Chapel; 1720–1771	Succeeded by John Rippon
