= Peter Masters =

English pastor, theologian, missionary, writer and biblical scholar

Peter Masters has been the Minister of the Metropolitan Tabernacle in central London since 1970. He founded the Evangelical Times, an evangelical newspaper, in 1967. He also directs the School of Theology, an annual conference for pastors and Christian workers at the Metropolitan Tabernacle.

== Sword and Trowel ==
Masters edits the international magazine Sword & Trowel (started by Charles Spurgeon in 1865).

== London Reformed Baptist Seminary ==
Masters initiated the London Reformed Baptist Seminary in 1976, and directs the further studies of both pastors and aspiring pastors in the Tabernacle's adjunct seminary. The seminary went online from 2011.

== Authorship ==
Masters has authored over 30 books, which have been translated into at least 28 other languages.

== Broadcasts ==
Masters' sermons have been broadcast in the UK since 2003 on the Sky channel UCB. In 2013 the Tabernacle programme transferred to the Sky channel Revelation TV, and is broadcast every Saturday evening in the UK and also in the USA. These broadcasts include a sermon from Dr Masters and an accompanying apologetic or biographical feature. Current UK channels are Sky Channel 581, Freeview HD Channel 241 and Freesat Channel 692. Programmes are also broadcast on a number of overseas radio stations including in New Zealand and the US.

== Distinctive ministerial emphases ==
=== The necessity of regular Gospel preaching ===
Masters has lobbied for the necessity of distinctive and frequent evangelistic addresses, and lamented the loss of this amongst evangelical ministers.

=== Separatism ===
By calling other ministers to remember and consider the Downgrade Controversy, Masters has advocated a duty of ministerial separation from churches that do not follow the major principles of historical evangelical doctrine, such as the necessity of regeneration, justification by faith without works, and belief in infallibility of the Bible. In this he has repeated the call of Martyn Lloyd-Jones, in his controversy with John Stott, to separate from non-evangelical churches, and followed in the tradition of E. J. Poole-Connor, the founder of the Fellowship of Independent Evangelical Churches.

=== Charismatic movement ===
Masters has opposed and challenged the teaching of the Charismatic Movement that New Testament sign gifts are still extant, arguing that the Bible contains the promise that it is both sufficient and complete, rendering new revelation both redundant and dangerous. This view has been described as cessationist. He has, upon the same grounds, critiqued claims of the gift of miraculous healing as spurious, lacking credibility and sometimes occultic.

=== Young Earth Creationist ===
Masters opposes Darwinism, which some evangelicals have seen historically as a form of humanist propaganda, and as a doctrine viewed as at variance with the first books of the Bible. He helped found the Newton Scientific Association, and has supported lectures and talks examining alleged weaknesses of the theory of evolution.

== Selected works currently in print ==
- Healing Epidemic, 1988 (ISBN 978-1-870855-00-6)
- Necessity of Sunday Schools: In This Post-Christian Era, 1992 (ISBN 978-1-870855-13-6)
- Should Christians Drink?: The Case for Total Abstinence, 1992 (ISBN 978-1-870855-12-9)
- Biblical Strategies for Witness, 1994 (ISBN 978-1-870855-18-1)
- Only One Baptism of the Holy Spirit, 1995 (ISBN 978-1-870855-17-4)
- The Baptist Confession of Faith 1689: Or, the Second London Confession with Scripture Proofs, Revised edition, 1998 (ISBN 978-1-870855-24-2)
- Do We Have a Policy?: Paul's Ten Point Policy for Church Health and Growth, 2002 (ISBN 978-1-870855-30-3)
- Worship in the Melting Pot, 2002 (ISBN 978-1-870855-33-4)
- Physicians of Souls: The Gospel Ministry, 2002 (ISBN 978-1-870855-34-1)
- The Lord's Pattern for Prayer, 2003 (ISBN 978-1-870855-36-5)
- God's Rules for Holiness: Unlocking the Ten Commandments, 2003 (ISBN 978-1-870855-37-2)
- Men of Purpose, Latest edition, 2003 (ISBN 978-1-870855-41-9)
- Heritage of Evidence: In the British Museum, 2004 (ISBN 978-1-870855-39-6)
- The Mutual Love of Christ and His People, 2004 (ISBN 978-1-870855-40-2)
- Not Like Any Other Book: Interpreting the Bible, 2004 (ISBN 978-1-870855-43-3)
- Joshua's Conquest: Was It Moral? And What Does It Say to Us Today? 2005 (ISBN 978-1-870855-46-4)
- Missionary Triumph Over Slavery: William Knibb and Jamaican Emancipation, 2006 (ISBN 978-1-870855-53-2)
- The Faith, Great Christian Truths, 2006 (ISBN 978-1-870855-54-9)
- Men of Destiny, 6th edition, 2008 (ISBN 978-1-870855-55-6)
- Steps for Guidance in the Journey of Life, 2008 (ISBN 978-1-870855-66-2)
- Church Membership in the Bible, 2008 (ISBN 9781870855648)
- Faith, Doubts, Trials and Assurance, 2006, (ISBN 9781870855501)
- World Dominion: The High Ambition of Reconstructionism [a critique], 1990, (ISBN 978-1-870855-167)
- Psalms & Hymns of Reformed Worship (editor), 1991
- The Personal Spiritual Life, 2013 (ISBN 9781908919205)
- The Charismatic Illusion, 2016 (ISBN 9781908919700)
- Charismatic Phenomenon, Jun 1988 (ISBN 978-1-870855-01-3)
- The Preacher’s Library, 1979 (ISBN 0-906356016)
- Remember the Prisoners, 1986 (ISBN 0-8024-7388-1)
