= Samuel Stennett =

English minister and hymnwriter (1727–1795)

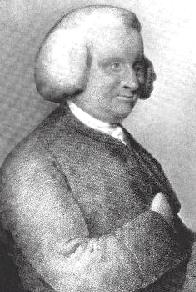
Samuel Stennett

Samuel Stennett (1 June 1727 – 24 August 1795) was an English Baptist minister and hymnwriter.

== Pastor and hymnwriter ==
He was born in Exeter, to a family of clergymen. His great-grandfather Edward was a dissenting pastor and his grandfather Joseph Stennett was a pastor and hymnwriter. His father Joseph was also a preacher.

At the age of 10 his family moved to London, where his father served as the minister of the Baptist church in Little Wild Street. Samuel succeeded his father as minister in 1758, a position which he held until his death. Samuel Stennett received a Doctorate of Divinity from King's College, Aberdeen in 1763.

Although friend and supporter to the reigning monarch, George III, Stennett refused political opportunities to devote himself to ministry. He attained prominence amongst the Dissenting ministry and used his influence with political figures on behalf of Dissenters prevented from fully participating in society, especially as teachers, under the Clarendon Code.

Stennett authored some 39 hymns, five of which appeared in Rippon's Selection, which was published in 1787. His grandfather, Joseph Stennett, had also been a prominent Dissenting hymn writer. Samuel continued this tradition, although with less passionate language than had marked his grandfather's Puritan-influenced notions of Christian experience.

More than any other of Samuel Stennett's hymns, "On Jordan's Stormy Banks", which was published in Rippon's Selection under the title "Promised Land," found enormous popularity especially amongst 19th-century American Methodists. It was sung in camp meetings and brush arbors, and also found its way into the 1835 Southern Harmony and is part of the American shape note tradition. Several of Stennett's hymns are preserved in the Sacred Harp.

== Hymns by Stennett ==
- How Charming Is the Place
- Majestic Sweetness Sits Enthroned
- On Jordan's Stormy Banks I stand (also known as "I am Bound for the Promised Land")
- Prostrate, Dear Jesus, At Thy Feet
