= Joseph Stennett =

English minister & hymnwriter (1663–1713)

Joseph Stennett (1663 – 11 July 1713) was an English Seventh Day Baptist minister and influential hymnwriter. He published several books of theological argument and sermons as well as hymns.

== Youth and marriage ==
Joseph Stennett was born in 1663 at Abingdon, Berkshire, England of pious parents, Edward Stennett and Mary (Quelch) Stennett. Edward was a dissenting (non-Anglican Church) preacher. Joseph attended Wallingford Grammar School. He was also tutored by his father, Edward, and older brother, Jedudah, and learned French, Italian, and Hebrew. Both his father and his brother had written Hebrew grammars. Joseph's heart was turned to Christ at an early age. In 1685, at the age of 22, he moved to London where he worked as a tutor.

In 1688, Joseph Stennett married a daughter of George Guill, a French Protestant refugee. Joseph Stennett was the father of Joseph Stennett, D. D. and the grandfather of Dr. Samuel Stennett. He was also the grandfather of Samuel's brother Joseph, who also had a son named Joseph.

== Ministry ==
In 1690, Joseph was ordained pastor of the Sabbatarian Baptist (Seventh Day Baptist) congregation meeting in London, at Pinner's Hall, where he served until his death in 1713. Hanserd Knollys, among others, spoke at his ordination. The church's first pastor had been Francis Bampfield, who died in 1684 in Newgate Prison. The Pinner's Hall congregation grew to between 120 and 150 members during Stennett's pastorate.

In his early ministry Stennett preached also, on Sabbath evenings, at the Devonshire Square Seventh Day Baptist Church. He mastered Hebrew. Early on, he was tutored by his father, Edward Stennett (died 1690), also a Baptist minister, and author of The Royal Law Contended For (1658) and The Seventh Day Sabbath (1664). He had also corresponded with Baptists in Newport, Rhode Island between 1668 and 1674, encouraging them as they organized the first Seventh Day Baptist Church in America in 1671.

Joseph Stennett was a Particular Baptist, and often supplied pulpit for Sunday churches as well. He was chosen to represent the body of Baptists and other Dissenters in regards to national affairs. Several sermons preached on public occasions were published, and one sermon (National Thanksgiving, 1704) won him the favour of Queen Anne.

== Death ==
After falling ill, Stennett followed the advice of his doctor and retired to the home of his brother-in-law, Mr. Morton, in Knaphill, Buckinghamshire, England. However the advice proved of little avail and he died there in 1713, at the age of 49.

== Published works ==
The writings of Joseph Stennett were collected after his death and published in 1732 in four volumes (The Works Of the late Reverend and Learned Mr. Joseph Stennett: In Five Volumes To which is prefix'd Some Account of his Life, London, 1732). The "fifth" volume was to have included the anti-pedobaptist treatise previously published (in 1704), An Answer to Mr. Russen's Book..., but was not, due to lack of funds. His works include:

- Hymns in Commemoration of the Sufferings of our Blessed Saviour Jesus Christ, Compos’d for the Celebration of His Holy Supper, 1697, (second edition revised & expanded 1705, third edition 1709)
  - Hymns in Commemoration of the Sufferings of ... Jesus Christ. Compos'd for the Celebration of His Holy Supper. London: J. Darby. 1697.
  - Hymns in Commemoration of the Sufferings of Our Blessed Saviour Jesus Christ: Compos'd for the Celebration of His Holy Supper. London: J. Darby. 1713.
- A Version of Solomon's Song of Songs together with the XIVth Psalm, 1697 (second edition, 1703; third edition, 1709)
- An Answer to Mr. David Russen's Book entitled: Fundamentals without a Foundation or a True Picture of the Anabaptists, 1704
  - An Answer to Mr. D. Russen's book entitul'd, "Fundamentals without a Foundation, or a True Picture of the Anabaptists". London: D. Brown. 1704.
- Hymns Compos'd for the Celebration of the Holy Ordinance of Baptism, 1712 (second edition, 1722)
  - HYMNS Compos'd for the celebration of the Holy Ordinance of Baptism (PDF). London. 1722.
- A translation of Dacier's Plato and other works from the French
  - The Works of Plato Abridg'd: With an Account of His Life ... Together with a Translation of His Choicest Dialogues.... Illustrated with Notes. Vol. 1. London: A. Bell. 1701.
  - The Works of Plato Abridg'd: With an Account of His Life ... Together with a Translation of His Choicest Dialogues.... Illustrated with Notes. Vol. 2. London: A. Bell. 1701.
- Various sermons

Joseph Stennett was one of the first significant Baptist hymnwriters. Isaac Watts (who was thirteen years younger than Joseph Stennett) praised Stennett, and included Stennett hymns in his noteworthy Hymns and Spiritual Songs in Three Books, published in 1707.

== Hymns written ==
- Another Six Days Work Is Done
- Lord, at Thy Table I Behold
- Behold the Savior of the World
- My Blessed Savior, Is Thy Love
- Come Every Pious Heart
- Again Our Weekly Labors End
- Behold The Grave Where Jesus Lay
- Behold The Savior On The Cross
- Come Let Us All, Who Here Have Seen
- Come Lowly Souls, that mourn
- In That Most Dark And Doleful Night
- Jehovah We In Hymns Of Praise
- Jesus! O Word Divinely Sweet!
- Return, My Soul, Enjoy Thy Rest
- See How The Willing Converts Trace
- The Great Redeemer We Adore
- Thou Art All Love My Dearest Lord
- Thus Was The Great Redeemer Plung'd
- Thus We Commemorate The Day
- 'Tis Finished, The Redeemer Cries
- With Lowly Minds And Lofty Song
- Gracious Redeemer, How Divine
- Our Lord, When Cloth'd With Mortal Flesh
- Lord, All These Works Of Thine
- My Soul, Let All Thy Nobler Powers
- Immortal Praise Be Given
- Whene’er One Sinner Turns to God
- I own I love; 'tis no uncomely fire
- Blest Day! Ordain'd by God
- When the Creator of the world had given
- Sacred Body of our Lord, The
- When th' ancient world God's patience try'd
- O Bless'd Redeemer! in thy side
- When from Egyptian slavery The Hebrews were redeem'd
- When fam'd Bethesda's waters flow'd
- In such a grave as this
- See in what grave our Saviour lay

== Other sources ==
- Lee, Sidney, ed. (1898). "Stennett, Joseph" . Dictionary of National Biography. Vol. 54. London: Smith, Elder & Co.
- Seventh Day Baptists in Europe and America, vols I & II, 1910
- Thomas Crosby, The History of the English Baptists, 1738, reprinted 1979
- John Rippon, A Selection of Hymns from the Best Authors, Intended to be an Appendix to Dr. Watts Psalms and Hymns, 1787
- Isaac Watts, Hymns and Spiritual Songs in Three Books, 1707
- Louis F. Benson (1915). The English Hymn: its Development and Use in Worship. New York: Hodder & Stoughton, George H. Doran Company. reprinted 1962
- B. A. Ramsbottom, Through Cloud and Sunshine: Four Generations of Faithful Witness-the story of the Stennett Family, 1982
- W. T. Whitley, A Baptist Bibliography, vols I & II, 1916
- Puritan Pulpit, Fall 1989, Vol 1, No. 3
- Charles Spurgeon, Our Own Hymn-Book. Reprinted by Pilgrim Press, N.D.
