= Martha P. Falconer =

Social reformer

Martha Platt Falconer (March 17, 1862 – November 26, 1941) was a pioneer social reformer.

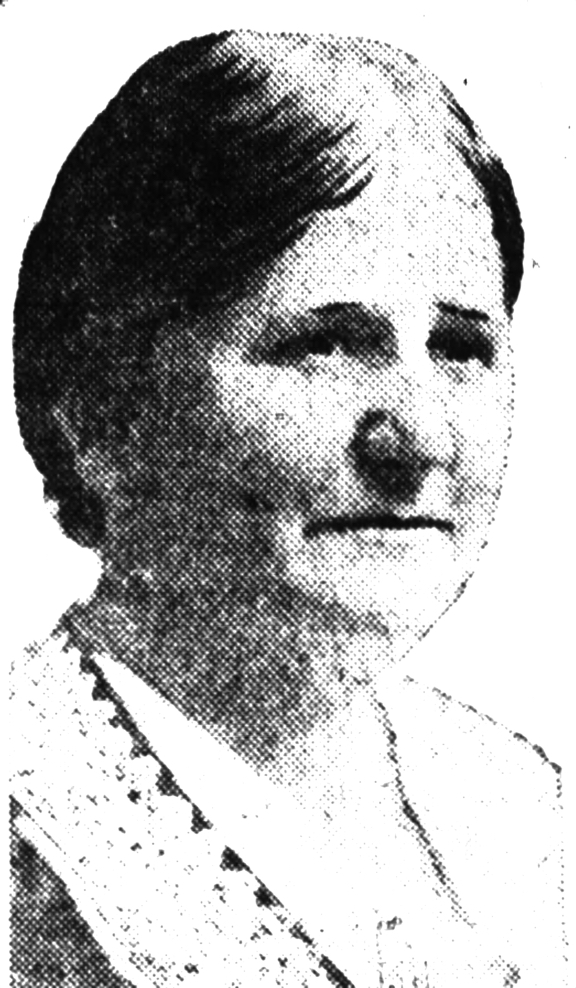
Falconer, around 1919

== Personal ==
She was born in 1862 in Delaware, Ohio, to Cyrus and Janette Platt. She moved to Philadelphia after the death of her mother. She was married to Cyrus Falconer.

She died in East Aurora, New York, aged 79, and was survived by children Helen, Douglas Platt and Cyrus Jr.

== Career ==
In 1906 she was appointed head of the House of Refuge, a girls' institution at 22nd Street and Girard Avenue, Philadelphia, Pennsylvania. She later became superintendent of the Sleighton Farm School for Girls, an institution "hailed as a major prison reform for women."

In 1906 she was assistant superintendent of the Illinois Children's Home and Aid Society.

During World War I, she had oversight of all reformatories and detention homes for girls in the United States.

Falconer was superintendent of the girls' department of the Glen Mills, Pennsylvania, schools in 1919 and left to take the superintendency of the department for delinquent girls and women in the American Social Hygienic Association, which was connected with the Rockefeller Foundation. In that job she was to "devote considerable attention to the establishing bureaus of women police" throughout the country.

In 1919 also, the Martha P. Falconer Infirmary was dedicated at the Samarcand Manor State Industrial Training School for Girls in North Carolina, the construction cost of $12,000 having been obtained by Mrs. Falconer from the federal government.

In 1933, Falconer was living in New York and was awarded an honorary Master of Arts degree by Elmira College.
