= Samarcand Manor State Industrial Training School for Girls =

Coordinates: 35.259°N 79.695°W

The Samarcand Manor State Industrial Training School for Girls was situated near Jackson Springs, twenty miles from Southern Pines and twelve miles from Star, North Carolina.

The idea for the institution originated with Mrs. A.A. McGeachy of Charlotte, and it was funded by the state in 1917. The first board of managers, consisting of A.A. McGeachy, president; Elizabeth Delia Dixon-Carroll, Mrs. J.R. Chamberlain, W.S. Blakeney, Mrs. Stephen C. Bragaw, and Mrs. Agnes McNaughton, the superintendent, held its first meeting on May 28, 1919.

The site was purchased from C.H. Henderson. Three buildings and a "chalet" were constructed. The first girl arrived on September 3, 1918. The next year there were 134 girls and women, with the average age being 19.

The infirmary at the institution was dedicated to and named after pioneer social reformer Martha P. Falconer.

The institution was for white females only.
