= Fellowship of Independent Evangelical Churches =

Organisation linking independent, evangelical churches in the United Kingdom

- Classification: Protestant
- Theology: Evangelical
- Polity: Independent
- National Director: John Stevens
- Associations: Affinity
- Region: United Kingdom
- Founder: Rev Edward Joshua Poole-Connor
- Origin: 1922 as A Fellowship of Undenominational and Unattached Churches and Missions
- Congregations: 665
- Members: 50,000
- Official website: fiec.org.uk

The Fellowship of Independent Evangelical Churches (FIEC) is a network of 665 independent evangelical churches in the United Kingdom. FIEC exists to help "Independent churches work together to reach Britain for Christ".

== Governance ==
The FIEC staff team is ultimately accountable to its affiliated churches. A 12-member Trust Board acts on behalf of the churches in making policy, safeguarding the Fellowship’s integrity, and in meeting - as its trustees - FIEC’s legal responsibilities. They are also responsible for ensuring the FIEC staff team serve the churches and fulfil FIEC’s vision. Trust Board members are voted into office by representatives from the churches and they serve in office for three years before re-election.

== History ==
FIEC was formed in 1922 under the name A Fellowship of Undenominational and Unattached Churches and Missions. It was later renamed The Fellowship of Independent Evangelical Churches. The Fellowship brought together many independent churches and mission halls, which had been somewhat isolated. By February 2021, FIEC had come to include 639 churches across Great Britain and the Channel Islands, and 50,000 members. In February 2024, 661 churches were listed as part of their membership.

== Beliefs ==
All FIEC churches unite around what they consider the truths of historic, biblical Christianity found in FIEC's Doctrinal Basis. Member churches also agree to abide with three accepted Ethos Statements. These are intended to bring clarity to life and ministry as a Fellowship. FIEC is in the Independent Evangelical tradition. According to the National Director of FIEC, "An ‘Independent’ church is self-governing. Each individual local church has ultimate control over its own affairs. It does not belong to any external body or institution which has control over it." The FIEC leadership claims it exercises 'something comparable to the sub-apostolic' ministry of Timothy and Titus. Some trace the routes of Independency to separatists, such as Robert Browne in the time of Elizabeth I and James I of England, but "separatism" may be an unhelpful term to use in the present day to describe FIEC, because although a church has to be autonomous and self-governing to affiliate to the FIEC, one of the main purposes of FIEC is that local churches should work together to share resources as they seek to advance the Christian Faith. A number of churches joined FIEC when they separated from a denomination that moved away from what they considered to be historic orthodox biblical Christianity. For example, Westminster Chapel, a leading church in the Independent tradition, joined FIEC when the Congregational Union of England and Wales merged with the English Presbyterian Church to form the United Reformed Church denomination (URC). Many Independent churches within FIEC are Baptist churches but FIEC is open both to churches that only baptise adults and also to churches that baptise the children of believers.

== Roles of men and women in the church ==
FIEC believes the classical complementarian view which recognises that the distinctive calling to be a pastor or elder in the local church is a calling for men. It also recognises and encourages a wide calling of ministries within the church for women and men.

== Relations with other churches ==
FIEC is the largest corporate partner of Affinity, which was previously called the British Evangelical Council. They also believe that Ecumenism in the form of Churches Together is not a positive move, citing various reasons including the liberal stance of other churches.
