= Elizabeth Delia Dixon-Carroll =

American physician

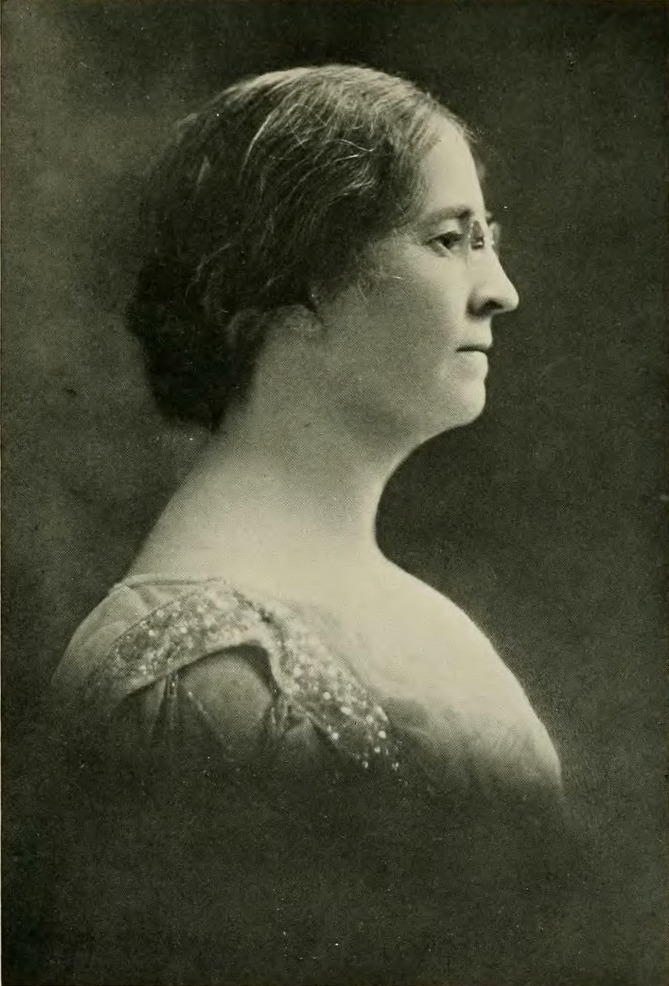
- Elizabeth Delia Dixon-Carroll, from the 1904 Yearbook of Meredith College
- Born: February 4, 1872; Shelby, North Carolina, USA
- Died: May 16, 1934 (aged 62); Raleigh, North Carolina, USA
- Occupation: Physician
- Spouse: Norwood G. Carroll

Elizabeth Delia Dixon-Carroll (February 4, 1872 – May 16, 1934) was an American physician, professor, and activist. When she started her practice, she was the only female physician working in Raleigh, North Carolina; she served as the first physician of Meredith College, where she also taught. Dixon-Carroll was active in the women's suffrage movement and campaigned for numerous Democratic candidates.

== Life and career ==
Elizabeth Delia Dixon was born in Shelby, North Carolina, to Thomas Dixon Sr., a Baptist preacher, and Amanda McAfee Dixon. Her four surviving siblings included author and white supremacist Thomas Dixon Jr. and pastor and evangelist A. C. Dixon.

After attending public school in her hometown of Shelby, Dixon attended Cornell University. This was followed by graduate work at Woman's Medical College of the New York Infirmary, now the New York-Presbyterian Lower Manhattan Hospital, from which she graduated first in her class in 1895.

Following her graduation, Dixon met Dr. Norwood G. Carroll, a dentist; both began practicing in Raleigh. They were married in 1900; the couple had no children.

Dixon-Carroll became an instructor and physician at Meredith College upon its opening in 1899. She remained in this position until her death in 1934. One of her most celebrated achievements was guiding Meredith through the influenza pandemic of 1918–19 without a single student dying of the disease.

Dixon-Carroll was a leading figure in the women's suffrage movement in North Carolina. She helped found both the Raleigh Women's Club and the North Carolina State Federation of Women's Clubs, serving as the first president of each; directed the Samarcand Manor State Industrial Training School for Girls upon its opening; and was a regular speaker at state suffrage conventions.

== Death ==
On May 15, 1934, Dixon-Carroll was involved in a serious automobile accident. She died in Rex Hospital in Raleigh the next day, May 16, 1934. She was survived by her husband, who lived until 1942.

== Legacy ==
Dixon-Carroll left a complex legacy for her effects on women's suffrage, race relations, and charitable institutions during her lifetime. Her work as a pioneering female physician and suffrage advocate is tempered by her white supremacist views. In 1920, Dixon-Carroll delivered several speeches for Democratic candidates in which she called for white North Carolinians to support women's suffrage in order to prop up white supremacy, stating "Not only would women suffrage give white control in Southern states a more permanent footing than now, but white supremacy will continue to grow, since the increase of white population is more rapid than the increase of colored population." Yet Dixon-Carroll gained the admiration of some contemporaneous African American women who reported that Dixon-Carroll "unlike her brother is helping all she can to raise the race and proclaim herself a sister to them." Her leadership of Samarcand Manor was also controversial, as allegations of squalor and abuse dogged the institution in the 1930s; Dixon-Carroll publicly dismissed the allegations despite their being verified by investigation.
