= William Harris Murch =

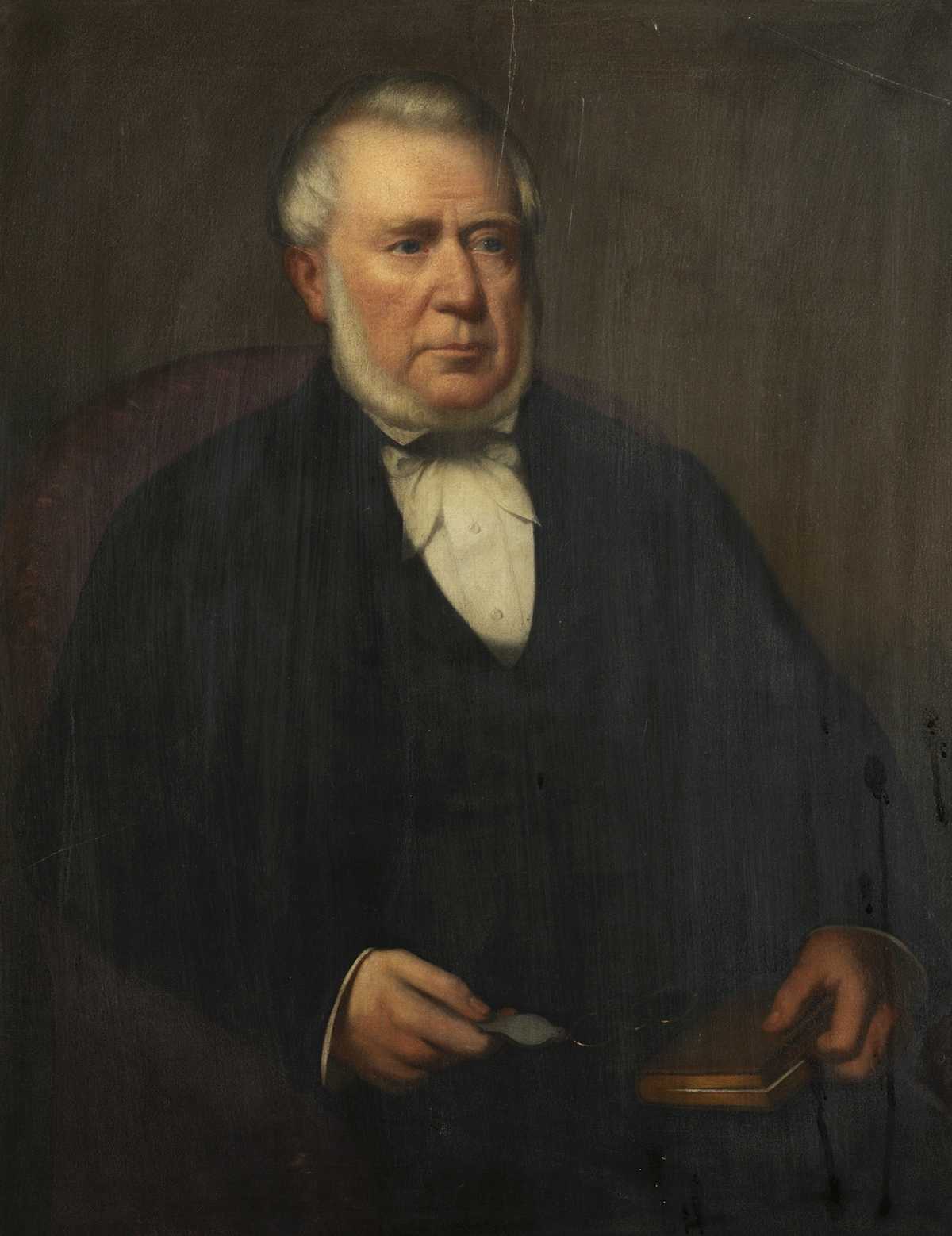
- Born: 1784; Honiton
- Died: 12 July 1859 (aged 74–75)
- Occupations: Preacher and Teacher
- Partner: Eleanor
- Children: Three

William Harris Murch (1784 – 12 July 1859) was a Baptist minister who served as a joint secretary of the Baptist Union and the Theological head and President of the Stepney Academy.

== Life ==
Murch was born in Honiton in Devon in 1784 and took to the church early, being known as a "boy preacher". He is said to have been inspired by reading a biography of Samuel Pearce, by Andrew Fuller. He attended Wymondley College, a dissenting academy that often moved location. He was baptised in 1802 as a young adult, in the Baptist style. After completing his training, he accepted an offer from the Sheppards Barton Meeting House at Frome only after he considered he was mature enough. After a long ministry there he was appointed the President and Theological Tutor of Stepney Academy in 1827 and he was awarded an honorary Doctor of Divinity by Brown University.

Murch became one of the joint secretaries of the Baptist Union in 1834 which was a post he was to retain for twelve years. It may be a coincidence but John Howard Hinton was later to say that although Baptists had been meeting for many years it was not until 1834 that the real Baptist Union was formed.

1840 World Anti-Slavery Convention. Murch is not specifically identified but you can move your cursor to identify other delegates or click the icon to enlarge

In 1840, Murch attended the World's Anti-Slavery Convention in London and he was one of the notable delegates recorded in the picture. After stepping down at Stepney Academy in 1843 and from his other formal positions Murch served for seven years with a Church in Rickmansworth before helping to form a church in Bath. Murch died in 1859.

== Legacy ==
Murch is in a painting in the National Portrait Gallery in London. He was also painted by George Frederick Clarke and this painting is now at the Regent's Park College in Oxford.
