= A. C. Dixon =

American preacher

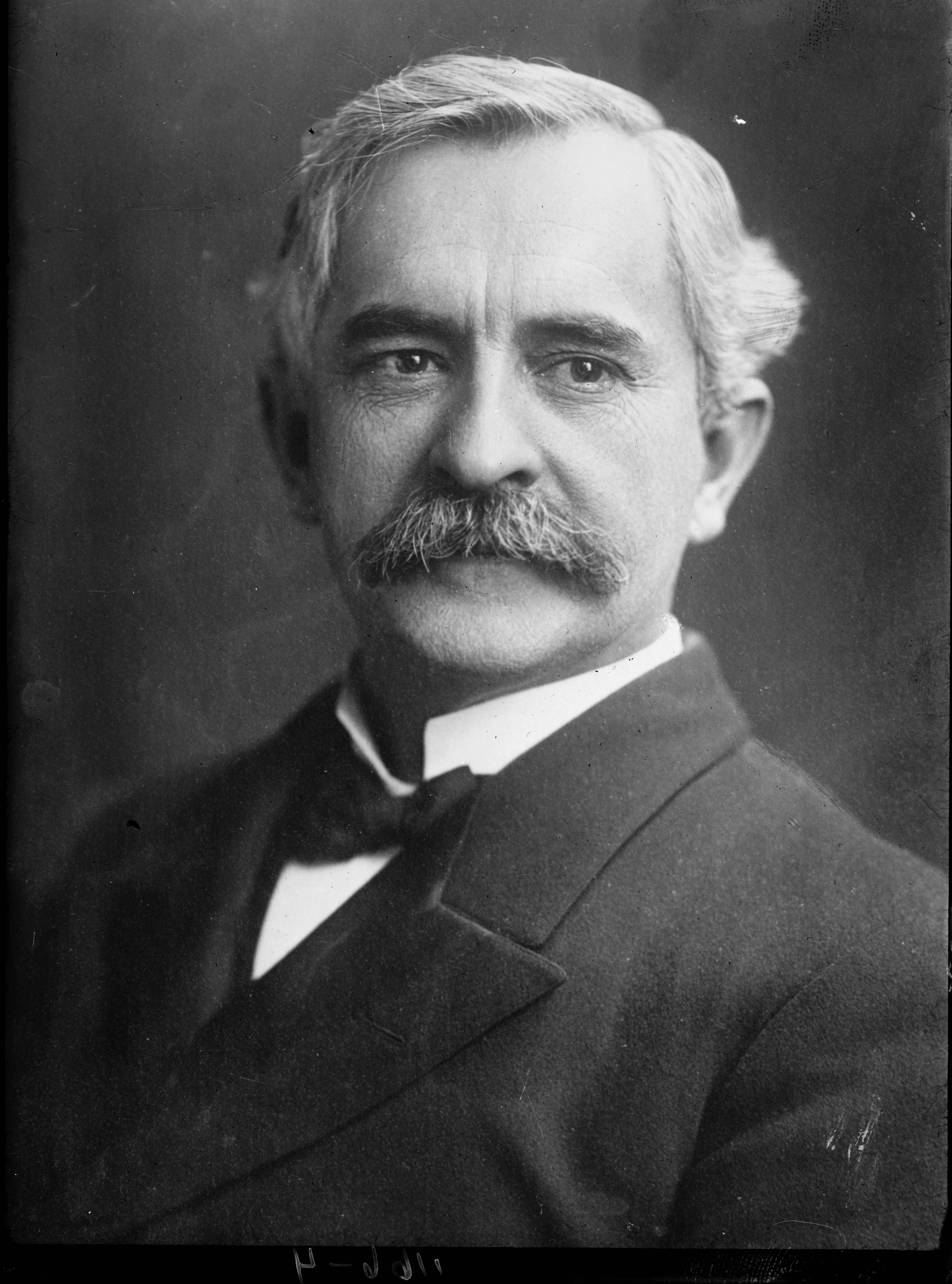
- Born: Amzi Clarence Dixon; July 6, 1854 near Shelby, North Carolina
- Died: June 14, 1925 (aged 70); London, England
- Education: Wake Forest College, Southern Baptist Theological Seminary
- Occupations: Minister and evangelist
- Known for: Influential in the early history of Christian fundamentalism
- Notable work: The Fundamentals (editor)
- Parents: Thomas Jeremiah Frederick Dixon (father); Amanda Elvira McAfee (mother)
- Relatives: Thomas Dixon Jr. (brother); Elizabeth Delia Dixon-Carroll (sister)

Amzi Clarence Dixon (July 6, 1854 – June 14, 1925) was a Baptist pastor, Bible expositor, and evangelist who was popular during the late 19th and the early 20th centuries. He was the first editor, followed by R. A. Torrey and Louis Meyer, of the influential series of essays published as The Fundamentals (1910–15) which gave Christian fundamentalism its name.

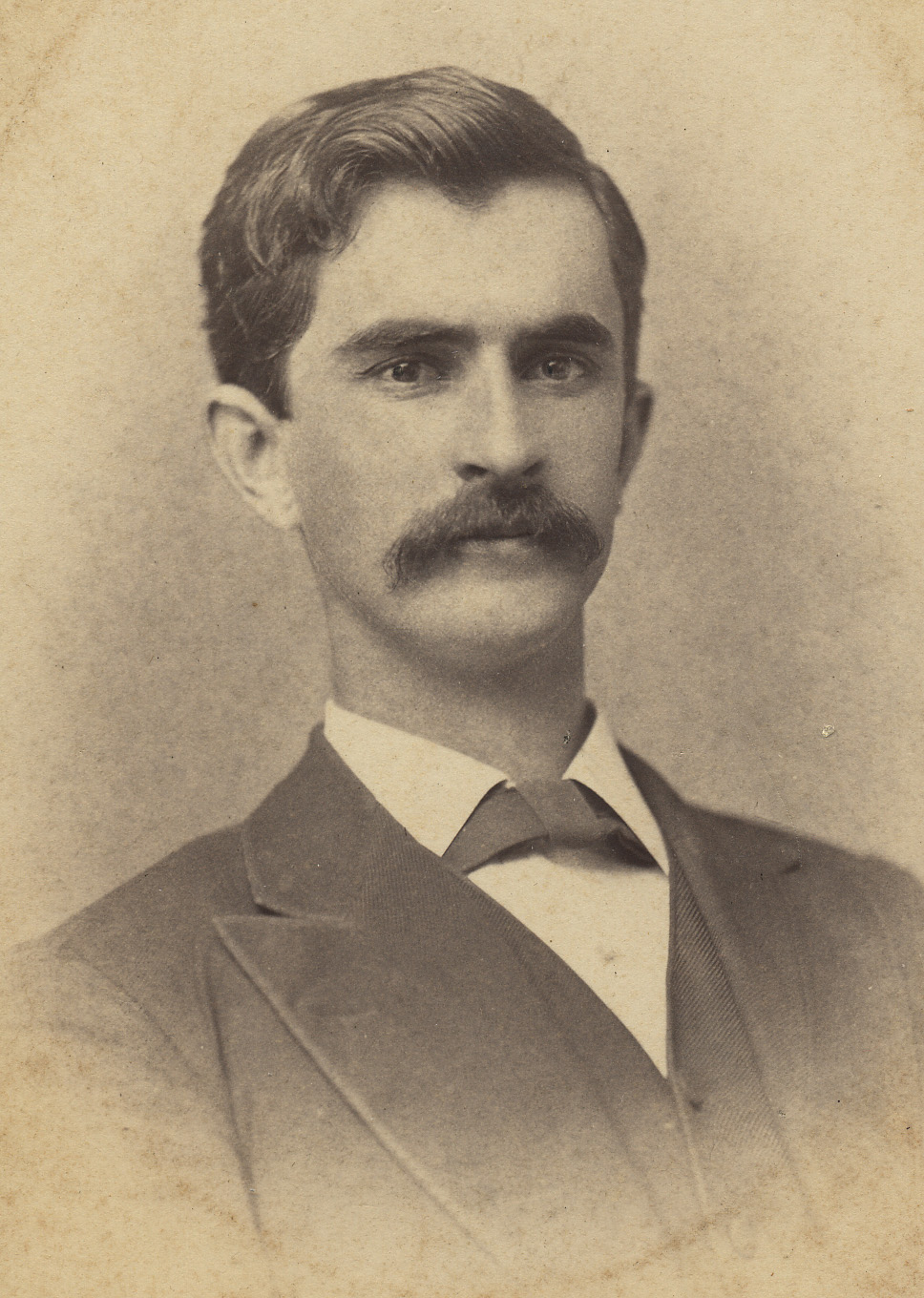
A.C. Dixon, c. 1882

== Early life ==
Amzi Clarence Dixon, who went by A. C., was born on a farm near Shelby, North Carolina, on July 6, 1854, to Thomas Jeremiah Frederick Dixon, a Baptist preacher, and Amanda Elvira McAfee Dixon. A. C. Dixon's brother Thomas Dixon Jr. was a preacher, novelist, lecturer, and promoter of white supremacy and the Lost Cause of the Confederacy, writing racist fiction such as The Clansman, which became the film The Birth of a Nation. Another younger brother, Frank Dixon, was also a preacher and lecturer.

While still young, A. C. Dixon believed he had been called to preach, and in 1875, he graduated from Wake Forest College, at that time in Wake Forest, North Carolina.

== Career ==
Dixon was ordained in 1876 and immediately began serving as pastor of two country churches. He also pastored in Chapel Hill and Asheville before he attended the Southern Baptist Theological Seminary (then in Greenville, South Carolina), where he was a student of John A. Broadus.

Thereafter, he served at Immanuel Church, Baltimore (1883–1890), Hanson Place Baptist Church, Brooklyn (1890–1900), Ruggles Street Church, Boston (1901–1906), the Moody Church, Chicago (1906–1911), and the Metropolitan Tabernacle, London (1911–1919). In Brooklyn, he often rented the Brooklyn Opera House for Sunday afternoon evangelistic services. In Boston, Dixon also taught at the Gordon Bible and Missionary Training School (now Gordon College), and he published Old and New, an attack on the Social Gospel movement.

In 1906, he moved to Chicago's Chicago Avenue Church, founded by Dwight L. Moody. Two years later, the church changed its name to the Moody Church. In Chicago, he also became a syndicated columnist, with his writings appearing in such newspapers as The Baltimore Sun, the Boston Herald, and the Chicago Daily News. Dixon was chosen by Lyman Stewart to edit the The Fundamentals because of a sermon he had given attacking "one of the infidel professors in Chicago." In 1911, he resigned his editorship of having completed the first five volumes, to assume the ministry of London's Metropolitan Tabernacle, formerly pastored by Charles Spurgeon. He often spoke at large Bible conferences. He retired in 1919, but in 1922, he returned to the ministry as the first pastor of University Baptist Church in Baltimore.

Dixon was a staunch advocate of Fundamentalist Christianity during its developmental period. His preaching was often fiery and direct, confronting various forms of Protestant apostasy, Roman Catholicism, Henry Ward Beecher's liberalism, Robert Ingersoll's agnosticism, Christian Science, Unitarianism, and higher criticism of the Bible.

He was active in the foundation of the World Christian Fundamentals Association (WCFA).

== Later life ==
Several months before his death, he suffered chronic back pain and suspended his service at University Baptist Church. He died of a heart attack on June 14, 1925.

== Works ==
- The Person and Ministry of the Holy Spirit (1890)
- Milk and Meat (1893; new edition, 1913)
- The Holy Spirit in Life and Service (1895)
- Heaven on Earth (1896)
- Lights and Shadows of American Life (1898)
- The Christian Science Delusion (1903)
- Present Day Life and Religion; A Series of Sermons on Cardinal Doctrines and Popular Sins (1905)
- Evangelism, Old and New (1905)
- The Young Convert's Problems and their Solution (1906)
- The Fundamentals (editor, first five volumes, 1910)
- The Bright Side of Life and Other Sermons (1914)
- The Glories of the Cross and Other Addresses (1914)
- Reconstruction (1919)
- The Birth of Christ, the Incarnation of God (1919)
- Why I Am a Christian (1921)
- Higher Critic Myths and Moths (1921)

Religious titles
Preceded by Archibald G. Brown	Pastor of the Metropolitan Tabernacle; 1911-1919	Succeeded by Harry Tydeman Chilvers
