= Archibald G. Brown =

British minister (1844–1922)

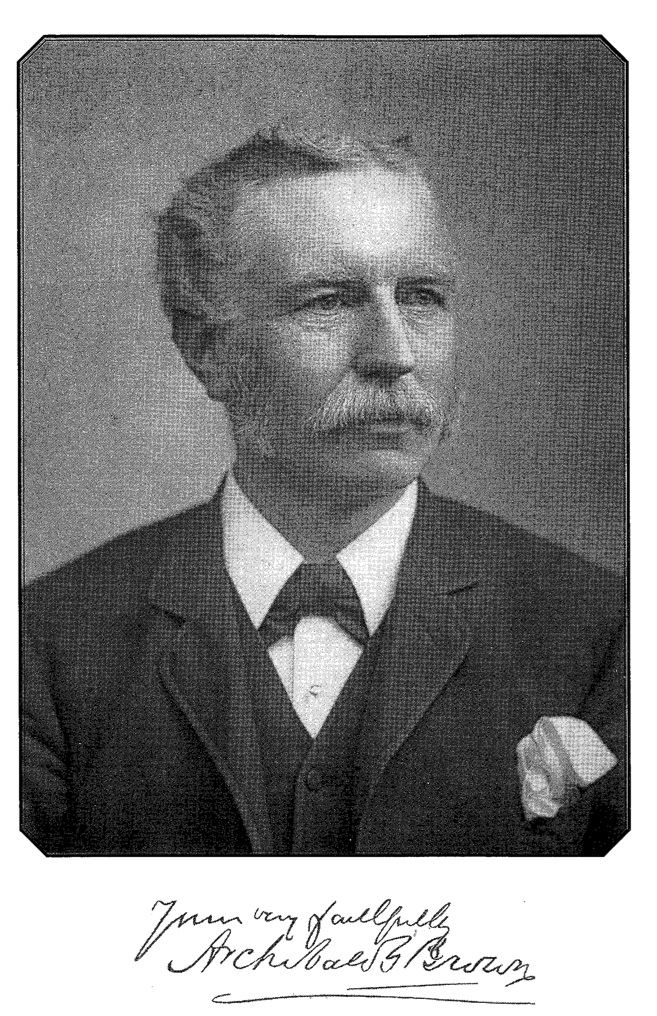
Archibald G. Brown

Archibald Geikie Brown (18 July 1844 – 2 April 1922) was a Calvinistic Baptist minister; a student, friend, and associate of Charles Spurgeon; and from 1908 to 1911, pastor of the Metropolitan Tabernacle in London, the church earlier pastored by Spurgeon.

Archibald's son, Douglas Brown, was also a Baptist minister and was influential in the 1921 Lowestoft revival.

== Early years ==
Brown, the son of a wealthy, evangelical London banker, was converted at age 16 through the influence of his Sunday school teacher at Spurgeon's Metropolitan Tabernacle, Ann Bigg (whom he later married), and a Church of England lay preacher, Stevenson Arthur Blackwood. In Brown's testimony, God "arrested a careless young man, who was cursing and swearing on Monday, and singing God's praises at twelve o'clock on Wednesday." He was baptised by Spurgeon in June 1861.

After the superintendent at the Union Chapel in Brixton Hill rejected his offer to teach at Sunday school, Brown rousted up his own group of boys and began holding a Bible class. He was soon encouraged by the minister to speak at Saturday evening prayer meetings. In 1862 Spurgeon accepted him as a student in his Pastors' College, though Brown was far younger than most of the other students. Spurgeon's wife recalled that of the hundreds of men that Spurgeon helped prepare for the ministry only one other man stood as high in his estimation as did Brown.

== East London Tabernacle ==
Simultaneously Brown began his ministry in the market town of Bromley, and after a strategic visit from Spurgeon, Brown established the Bromley Baptist Chapel as well as creating a bit of notoriety for himself by making a public lecture that reflected negatively on the Established Church. In 1864, when he was twenty, Brown became pastor of the Stepney Green Tabernacle in the East End of London. When he took charge of a church seating 800, there were only a "handful" of listeners, but by 1867 the crowds attending were so great that one evening even Brown's wife couldn't make her way in. By 1872, the church had put up the East London Tabernacle, an enormous building seating 2,500, "probably the second chapel in London in regard to size" but more resembling prison or a "square brick-built ice-house" than a church. Even so, attendance ran to 3,000 with hundreds unable to gain admission. (Eventually authorities called a halt to shoppers crowding the aisles with their purchases during Saturday night prayer meetings.)

Brown and his wife Annie had a happy marriage, and six children were born to them before Annie's death in 1874. A year later, Brown married Sarah D. Hargreaves of Liverpool, but she died in childbirth in 1876. In 1878 he married Edith C. A. Barrett, and they had three boys and a girl during their seventeen-year marriage.

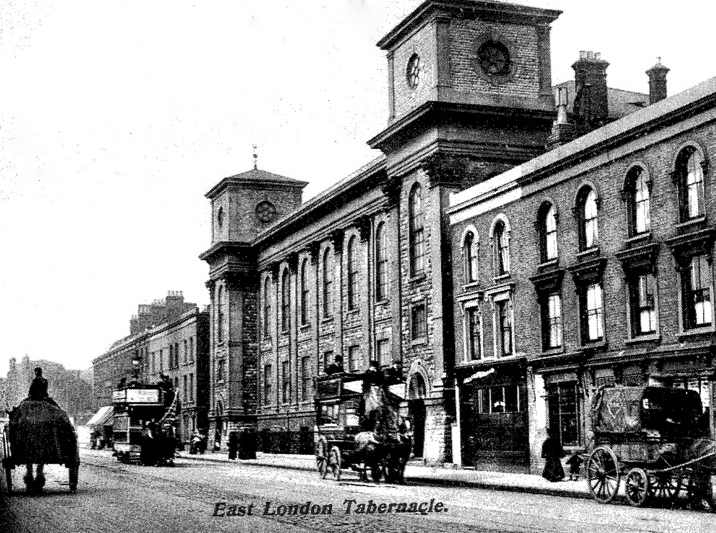
East London Tabernacle, c.1880s

Brown felt deeply the deprivation and poverty of London's East End. He instituted an annual "Thanksgiving Day," during which he sat in the vestry and collected money for the relief of the poor. "Much of this came in penny coins from those whose own means were very limited." In 1880 Brown established his own mission and employed two missionaries, later increased to nine, who visited thousands of houses, including some in which the occupants had pulled down banisters to burn for warmth and had sold their cast iron stoves for food. After calling on a dying widow oppressed by the fear that her infant would be taken to the workhouse, "a school of sin," Brown organised an orphanage for boys on Harley Street adjacent to Bow Road in Bow East London. This endeavour was followed by an orphanage for girls, a soup kitchen, and a seaside home at Herne Bay, Kent. Brown became a close friend of Thomas Barnardo, who also addressed social conditions in the East End.

Nevertheless, Brown opposed the incipient Social Gospel movement, believing that promoting social reform through political efforts was essentially valueless: "Among the working classes what is known as the Social Gospel has done as much harm as anything. I hate the expression Social Gospel. Sometimes I think it must have been invented by the devil." In the late 1880s, Brown published a pamphlet entitled "The Devil's Mission of Amusement," that argued against the growing belief that churches ought to provide secular activities and amusements to attract non-church goers; for his pains he was called "a morbid pietist," "a sour bigot," "a kill-joy," and "a victim of religious melancholia." Brown also opposed the use of musical instruments in worship. More significantly, in 1887, Brown agreed with Spurgeon in deciding to withdraw from the Baptist Union during what was called the "down grade controversy" over the presence of clergymen who did not believe that the Bible was inspired or was a final divine revelation, foundational to truth.

After the death of Spurgeon in 1892, Brown's third wife became gravely ill and was told by doctors that she could no longer live in London. Brown submitted his resignation to the East End Tabernacle; while it was under discussion, his wife died. Nevertheless, the East End had also undergone significant demographic change as wealthier church families moved out and poorer Jewish families moved in. Without his wife's presence, Brown believed that the work was "pressing too hardly upon me," and he resigned his pastorate in 1897.

== Later ministry ==
After a preaching tour of the United States (including a month spent in Denver, Colorado) and a visit to Palestine, Brown returned to London and, in June 1897, married Hannah Gearing Hetherington, a former hospital matron. It was to be the longest of his four marriages, twenty-five years. At about the same time, he became pastor of Chatsworth Road Baptist Church in West Norwood, South London. The church was at a "somewhat low ebb," but by 1900 Brown was filling the building, which seated 1,100. Many new members were converted through his preaching.

In 1907 Brown accepted a call to co-pastor Metropolitan Tabernacle with C.H. Spurgeon's son, Thomas. After the father's death, attendance had fallen, and Thomas Spurgeon was overwhelmed by the number of agencies and institutions his father had created as satellites of church. The co-pastorate was dissolved in 1908 when Thomas Spurgeon resigned for reasons of health, and Brown accepted the role of sole pastor. By 1910 Brown himself was ill, and he resigned at the end of the year, though he continued to preach occasionally even after the American, A. C. Dixon, had been called as pastor. In 1911 Brown sailed to South Africa, where one of his daughters was a missionary, and then to Tasmania. In 1913 he was supplying the Baptist church in Sandown, Isle of Wight; but the following year he left again for South Africa, serving as pastor of the Wale Street Baptist Church in Cape Town. At the end of World War I, Brown returned to England and "after many months of weakness and suffering," he died on 2 April 1922, nine days after his fourth wife.

== Select publications ==
- The Glorious Person and Work of the Holy Spirit Addresses by A. G. Brown (London: Elliot Stock, 1896.)
- The Devil's Mission of Amusement (1889)
- The Face of Jesus Christ: Sermons on the Person and Work of Christ (Edinburgh: Banner of Truth, 2012)
- The God Our God: Creator, Judge, Saviour
- In the Valley of Decision

== Notes ==
Religious titles
Preceded by Thomas Spurgeon	Pastor of the Metropolitan Tabernacle; 1908-1911	Succeeded by Amzi Dixon
