= Joseph Angus =

English minister (1816–1902)

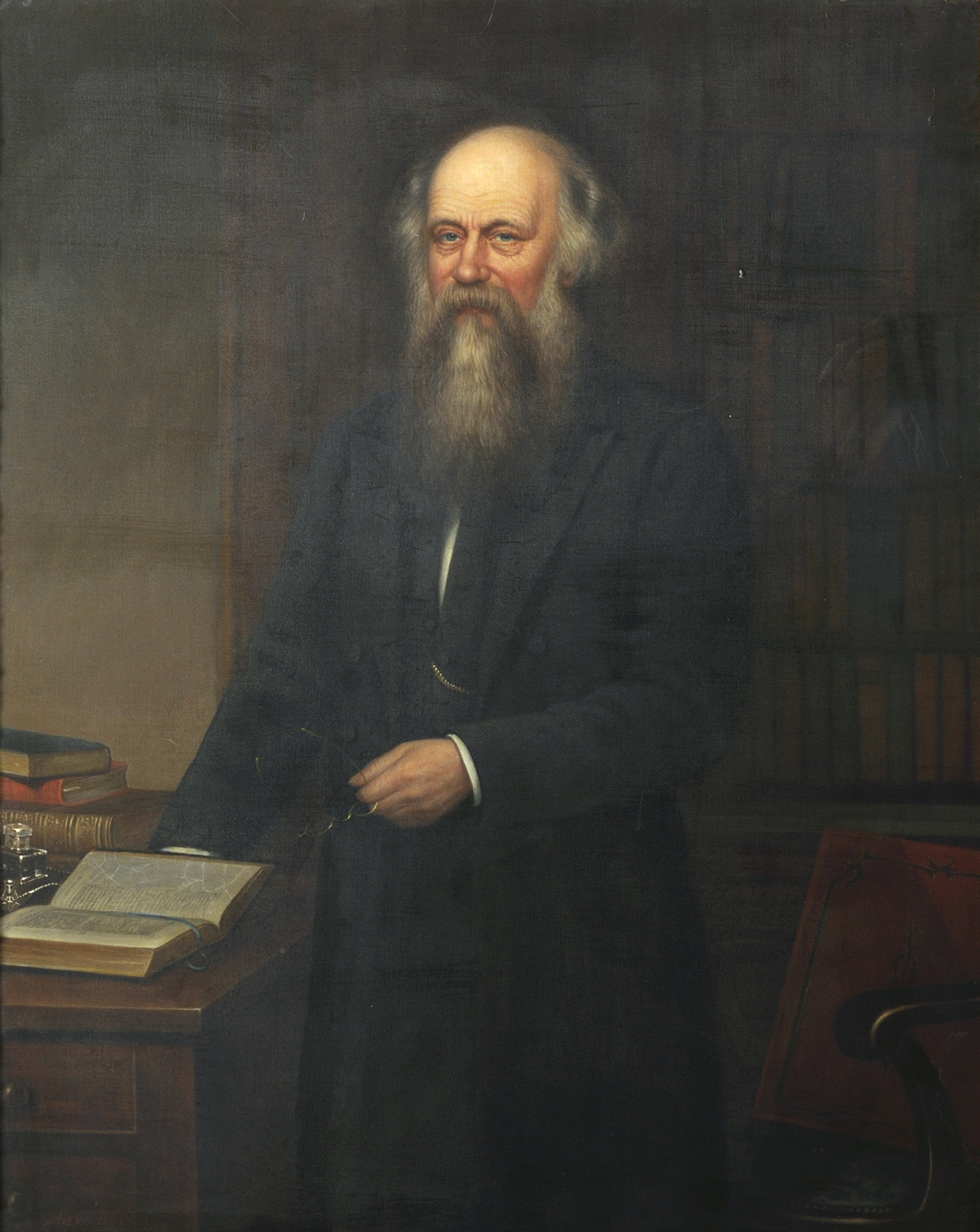
- Joseph Angus, 1883 portrait
- Born: 16 January 1816; Bolam, Northumberland
- Died: 28 August 1902 (aged 86); Hampstead
- Education: King's College, London, Stepney College; University of Edinburgh
- Occupation: Minister
- Known for: Head of Stepney College

Joseph Angus (January 1816 – August 1902) was an English Baptist minister, college head, and biblical scholar.

== Life ==
The only son of John Angus, a farmer and later a leather merchant, by his wife Elizabeth Wanless, he was born at Bolam, Northumberland. His first schooling was at Newcastle, under George Ferris Whidborne Mortimer, who wanted to send him to Cambridge. As a nonconformist and a member of the Baptist church under Thomas Pengilly at Newcastle, he preferred the University of Edinburgh, where he entered in 1834, after passing a year at King's College, London. In 1835, he studied for the Baptist ministry at Stepney College under William Harris Murch. Returning to Edinburgh with a scholarship under Dr. Ward's trust, he graduated M.A. 27 April 1837.

In 1838, Angus accepted a call to New Park Street chapel, Southwark. In 1840, he was appointed colleague to John Dyer in the secretaryship of the Baptist Missionary Society, and became sole secretary in 1841; there he was a fundraiser, in particular for the mission house in Moorgate Street. In 1849, he became head of Stepney College, which under his presidency moved to Regent's Park College in 1856: he held the post till 1893.

The degree of D.D. was conferred on Angus in 1852 by Brown University. From 1859, he was for ten years examiner in English to London University, and in 1865 to the Civil Service Commission. In 1870, he was appointed on the New Testament company for the revision of the King James Bible. He was elected in 1870 for Marylebone to the first London School Board: In all he spent nearly 12 years on the board: from 1870 to 1873, 1876 to 1882 and 1894 to 1897.

As a theologian Angus was conservative; in a debate of 1870 he upheld the doctrine of eternal torment. He died at Hampstead on 28 August 1902, and was buried in Norwood cemetery.

== Angus Library ==
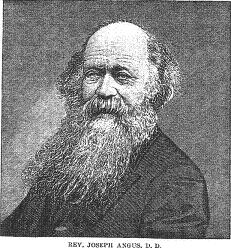
Portrait of Angus from A History of the Baptists in 1890

His collection of books by Baptist authors formed the basis of the Angus Library and Archive. Now housed at Regent's Park College, it is the leading collection of Baptist history and heritage worldwide.

== Works ==
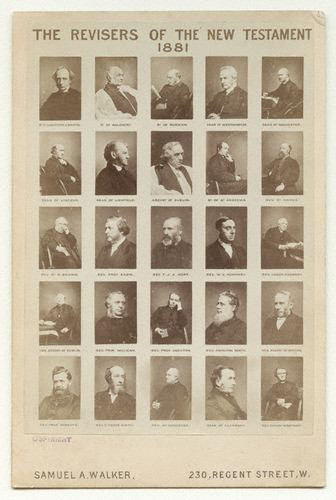
Photographs showing the revisers of the New Testament 1881. Angus is shown far right, second row

Angus's major works were:

- The Voluntary System (prize essay), 1839.
- Four Lectures on the Advantages of a Classical Education as an auxiliary to a Commercial Education, 1846.
- "The Bible Handbook - An Introduction to The Study of Sacred Scripture" 1854
- Christian Churches (bicentenary prize essay), 1862; 1864.
- Egypt and the Bible, 1863.
- Apostolic Missions, 1871; 2nd edit. 1892.
- Man, a Witness for Christianity, 1872.
- Popular Commentary on the New Testament (Hebrews to Jude), 1883.
- Six Lectures on Regeneration (the Angus Lectureship), 1897.

Angus worked on the bibliography of Baptist authors. Baptist Authors and History, 1527–1800, was printed in the Baptist Handbook in 1894, and issued separately in 1896.

As a textbook writer, Angus produced: handbooks to the Bible (1853; 2nd imp. 1907), to the English language (1864; 1868), and to English literature (1866); and editions of Joseph Butler's Analogy and Sermons (1855; 2nd edit. 1881) and Francis Wayland's Elements of Moral Science (1858). All these were published by the Religious Tract Society.

== Family ==
Angus married on 3 March 1841 Amelia (died 1893), fourth daughter of William Brodie Gurney. Of their family of four sons and six daughters, the second son John Mortimer Angus became registrar of the University of Wales.

== Notes ==
Attribution

This article incorporates text from a publication now in the public domain: Lee, Sidney, ed. (1912). "Angus, Joseph". Dictionary of National Biography (2nd supplement). Vol. 1. London: Smith, Elder & Co.
