= Keach's Catechism =

Particular Baptist catechism

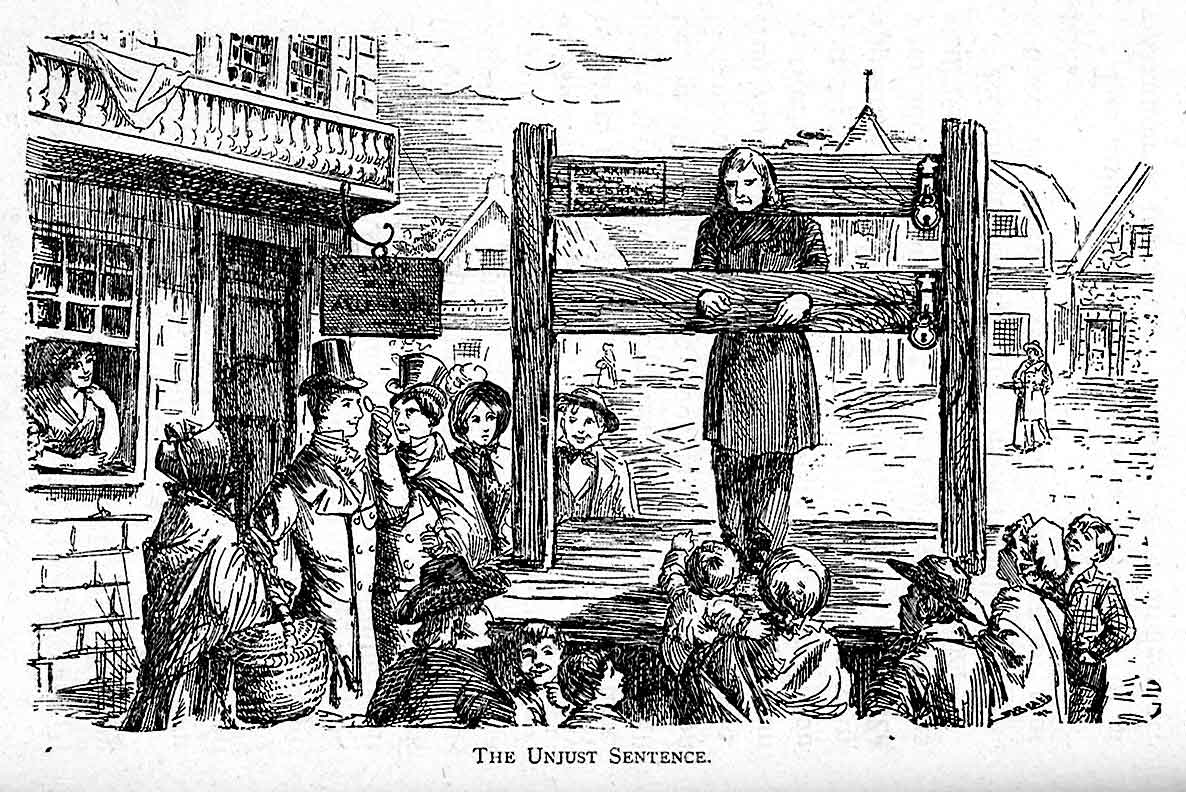
Benjamin Keach was pilloried for writing a catechism.

The Keach's Catechism, also called the Baptist Catechism, is a Particular Baptist catechism consisting of a set of basic questions and answers from scripture teaching readers the basics of the Baptist faith.

The Catechism is similar to the earlier Westminster Catechism and Heidelberg Catechism except for the sections on Baptism. It followed the Second London Confession of Faith drafted up in 1677 which was later ratified by over 100 Baptist congregations in England and Wales in 1689, which was signed by Hanserd Knollys, William Kiffin, Benjamin Keach, and others Baptist divines. The Confession was written by English Baptists who held to a Calvinistic analysis to give a formal scriptural explanation of their Christian faith from a Baptist perspective. One of the preachers active in creating the Second London Confession of Faith, Benjamin Keach, is often credited with the writing of the Baptist Catechism, also commonly known as "Keach's Catechism" (although it was likely compiled by William Collins, Keach's associate in drafting the Confession of Faith). The catechism was officially published by the British Particular Baptists in 1693. The Second London Confession, which the Baptist Catechism was based upon, was later adopted by the Philadelphia Baptist Association in 1742, in America.

== Differing versions ==
Various editions of this catechism contain different numbers of questions, some containing 114, and some 118. Though it has attained a wide distribution under the same title, the 118 question edition appears to have been edited by John Piper, and dates from 1986. The shorter 114-question version is the original version. Below is a summary of the changes made in the longer version.

- Replaces question 2 with the famous first question of the Westminster Shorter Catechism ("What is the chief end of man?").

- The original second question was, "Ought everyone to believe there is a God?"

- Adds a new question numbered 5 ("How do we know that the Bible is the Word of God?")
- Adds a new question numbered 89 ("What then is the purpose of the law since the fall?")
- Adds a new question numbered 99 ("How do Baptism and the Lord’s Supper differ from the other ordinances of God?")
- Removes the question that was number 103 in the shorter version ("Who are the proper subjects of this ordinance [the Lord's Supper]?")
- Adds a new question numbered 105 ("What is the visible church?")
- Adds a new question numbered 106 ("What is the invisible church?")

One final difference of interest between the original and modified versions of the Keach's Catechism is the wording of question 46 in the original and 47 in the modified edition. The original version has, "What is the sum of the ten commandments?" while the modified version gives, "Where is the obedience of faith given in summary form?" This change may be theologically significant as the modified edition equates "obedience of faith" with what is commonly referred to as the moral law. Because some theologians in Baptist circles have suggested that there are two stages of justification, the final stage of which is dependent on obedience to the moral law, this modification may represent a tendency toward the two-stage justification model.
