= E. J. Poole-Connor =

Edward Joshua Poole-Connor (27 July 1872 to 20 January 1962) was an evangelical preacher and Christian leader whose ministry spanned a most turbulent period in British church life, from the time of Charles Spurgeon to the 1960s, and whose record and analysis of its events has been widely observed.

== Bible League Quarterly ==
He edited this quarterly magazine, alongside Bishop D. A. Thompson, first founded in 1892 to defend the inerrancy of the Holy Scriptures. The magazine was started shortly after Charles Spurgeon's death. Following Spurgeon's lead in the Downgrade Controversy, he felt a strong responsibility to advocate ecclesiastical separation from churches he perceived to be in profound theological error. He wrote:

Evangelicals who remain in complacent fellowship with those who deny their faith are not only failing to stem the tide of apostasy; they are accelerating the pace. Their very leniency is eloquent advocacy; it cries aloud to multitudes that what men call liberalism in religion is far from being the harmful thing that Spurgeon thought it, for are not they - outstanding evangelicals - hand-in-glove with those who teach it?

== Founder of the Fellowship of Independent Evangelical Churches ==
The FIEC is an association of churches, affiliated together in distinction from the other nonconformist denominations, which Poole-Connor perceived to be falling prey to serious defection from historic evangelical doctrine and practice. He was a founder member of the International Council of Christian Churches and opposed the ecumenism of the World Council of Churches, which he regarded as apostate.

== Involvement in The Lord's Day Observance Society ==
He vigorously supported the defence of the free observance of Sunday worship, and helped administer the Lord's Day Observance Society, opposing encroachments upon this liberty.

== Secretary of the North Africa Mission ==
He served as secretary to the North Africa Mission, later known as Arab World Ministries, between his two pastorates at Talbot Tabernacle.

== Restorationist ==
Like Spurgeon, and many Puritan and Evangelical predecessors he held Restorationist views about Israel's return.

This nation, so highly honored, so deeply guilty, so sorely punished, is to be restored...the breaking of Israel’s day will be preceded by an hour of darkness, the most intense and awful that this suffering nation has ever known.

== Publications ==
- Evangelicalism in England (The Fellowship of Independent Evangelical Churches, 1951).
- Evangelical Unity (The Fellowship of Independent Evangelical Churches, 1941).
- Apostasy Of English Non-Conformity (1933)
- Denominational Confusion and the Way Out
- Why I Prefer the Authorised Version of the English Bible
- The Revised Standard Version
- Islam - What Is It?
- Mohammedism, An Elementary Catechism (Fellowship of Faith for the Moslems, 1959)
- The Teaching and Influence of Honor Oak
- The Coming of the Son of Man
- The Gateway to a Golden Age, Or Is Christ Coming Again? (Sovereign Grace Advent Testimony)
- Champion for the Truth, The Prophetic Messages (Sovereign Grace Advent Testimony)

Posthumous works:

- Christ's Millennial Kingdom (Sovereign Grace Advent Testimony, 1987)
- The World Council of Churches, Whence ... and Whither? A Brief Examination of the Modern Ecumenical Movement (British Evangelical Council, 1967)
