= John Rippon =

English Baptist minister (1751-1836)

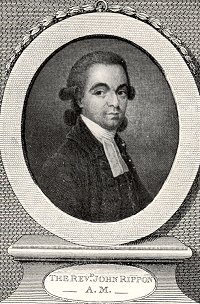
John Rippon

John Rippon (29 April 1751 – 17 December 1836) was an English Baptist minister. In 1787 he published an important hymnal, A Selection of Hymns from the Best Authors, Intended to Be an Appendix to Dr. Watts' Psalms and Hymns, commonly known as Rippon's Selection, which was very successful, and was reprinted 27 times in over 200,000 copies. Many hymns originally published in Rippon's Selection are preserved in the Sacred Harp.

== Life ==
At the age of 17, Rippon attended Bristol Baptist College in Bristol, England. After the death of John Gill, he assumed Gill's pastorate, the Baptist meeting-house in Carter Lane, Tooley Street, Southwark, from 1773 at the age of 20 until his death, a period of 63 years. During these times, the church experienced great growth and became one of the largest congregations in the country. The congregation moved to New Park Street from Carter Lane in 1833. The New Park Street Chapel could seat 1,200 people. Rippon's church was later pastored by Charles Haddon Spurgeon before moving to the Metropolitan Tabernacle at Elephant and Castle.

Rippon edited the Baptist Annual Register for 12 years. He was considered the foremost authority on the hymns of Isaac Watts. Rippon's Selection of hymns were used by the congregation until 1866 when Spurgeon produced an update called "Our Own Hymn Book". Spurgeon's book borrowed much from Rippon and Watts, as well as writers such as Ralph Erskine, Horatius Bonar and William Cowper. Like John Gill, he looked for a large scale conversion of the Jews at the end of the age.

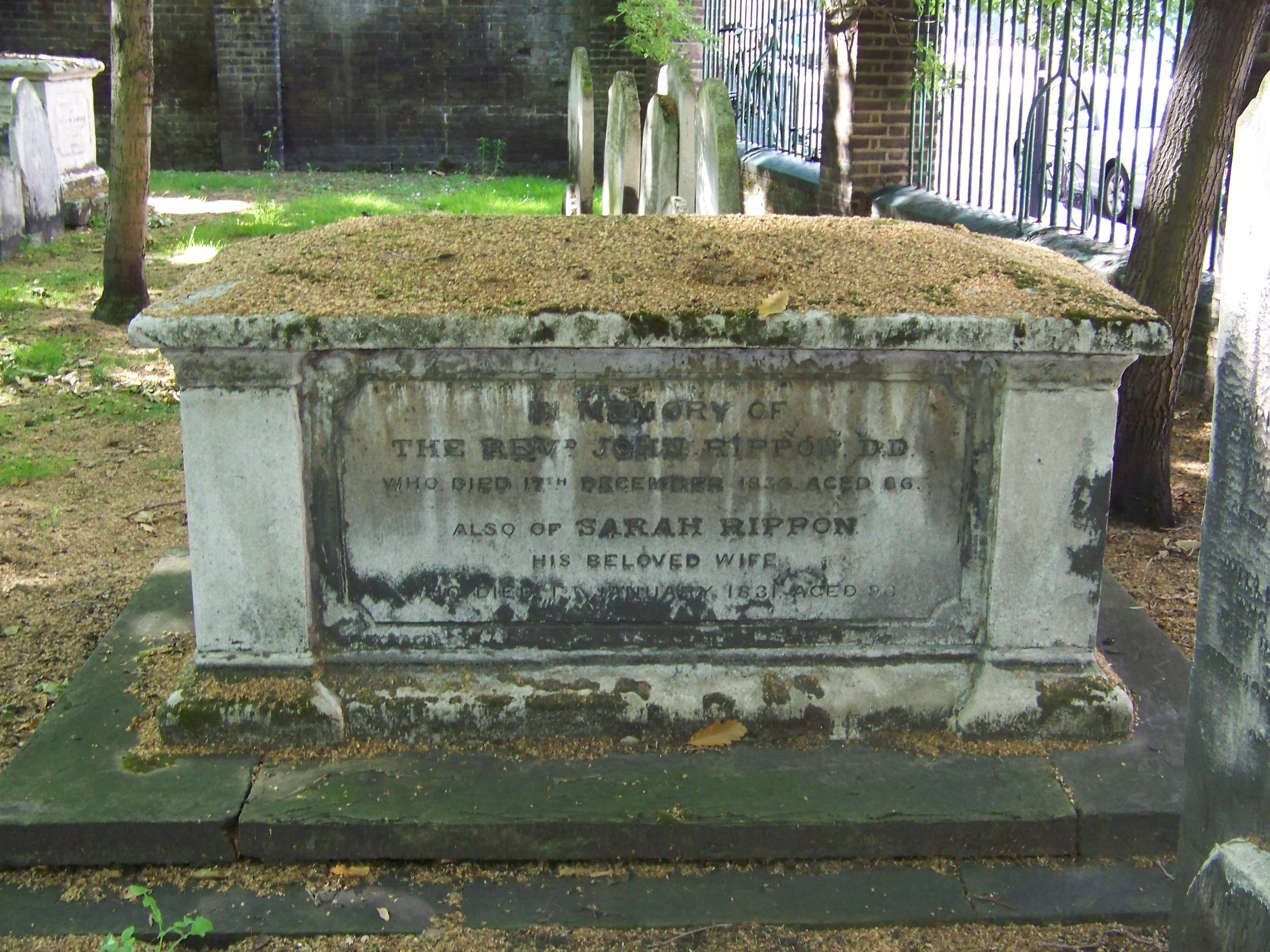
Rippon's grave in Bunhill Fields, London

At the time of his death, he was working on a book commemorating those buried in London's Dissenter cemetery, Bunhill Fields, where he himself was buried.

His younger brother, Thomas Rippon, served as the Chief Cashier of the Bank of England from 1829 to 1835.

== Bibliography ==
- Manley, Ken R. 'Redeeming Love Proclaim': John Rippon and the Baptists (Carlisle, Paternoster Press, 2004) (Studies in Baptist History and Thought - SBHT, 12).
- Manley, Ken R., "John Rippon and Baptist Hymnody," in Isabel Rivers and David L. Wykes (eds), Dissenting Praise: Religious Dissent and the hymn in England and Wales (Oxford, Oxford University Press, 2011), 95–123.

Religious titles
Preceded by John Gill	Pastor of the New Park Street Chapel; 1773-1836	Succeeded by Joseph Angus
