= Churches Together =

Churches Together may refer to:

- Churches Together in Britain and Ireland
- Churches Together in England

or other related ecumenical bodies in Britain and Ireland.
