= Holford House =

English country house in London, England

Coordinates: 51°32′2″N 0°09′43″W

Holford House was an English country house built in the Regent's Park in 1832, then on the outskirts of London. It was used at various times in its history as a private residence and an educational college for Dissenters before being destroyed by a German air raid in 1944.

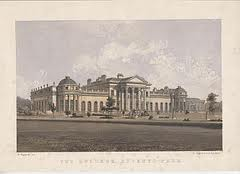
Holford House in 19th century

== History ==
Built in 1832, the Holford House was designed by Decimus Burton for James Holford, a wealthy merchant and wine importer. At the time, it was the largest house in the Regent's Park. Holford lived there until his death in 1853, when the house was leased by Regent's Park College, a Baptist college for the training of ministers, which later became affiliated with the University of Oxford. The College moved out in 1927, during which time it is unclear who or what occupied the house.

It was described as 'a mansion of large extent and rare magnificence' by Edward Walford's guide to London in 1878.

The house was destroyed during a German air raid in 1944.
