= Baptist College, Stepney =

Coordinates: 51.517972°N 0.044360°W

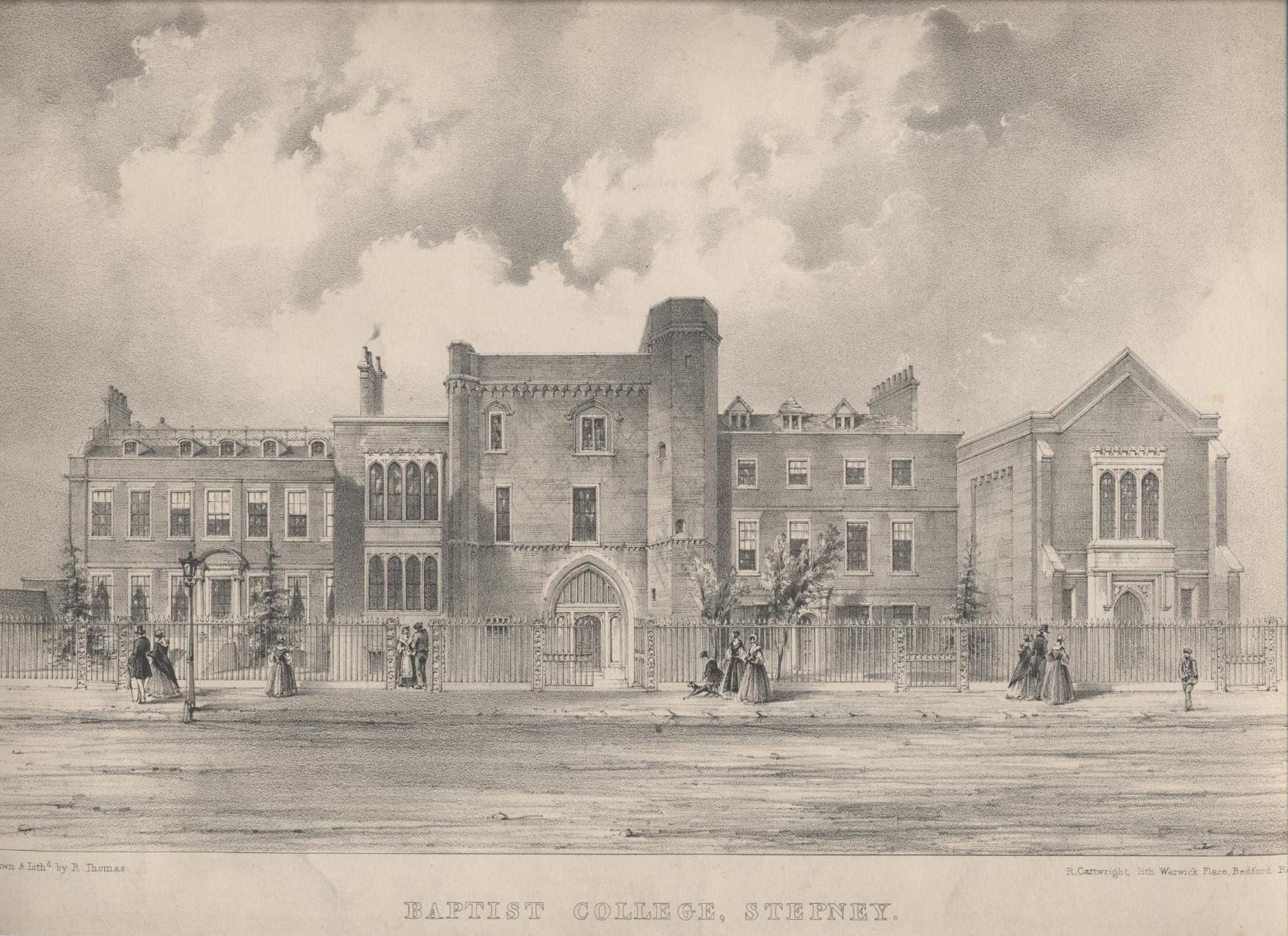
Drawing of the Baptist College, the section to the far right being the only remaining evidence of the building

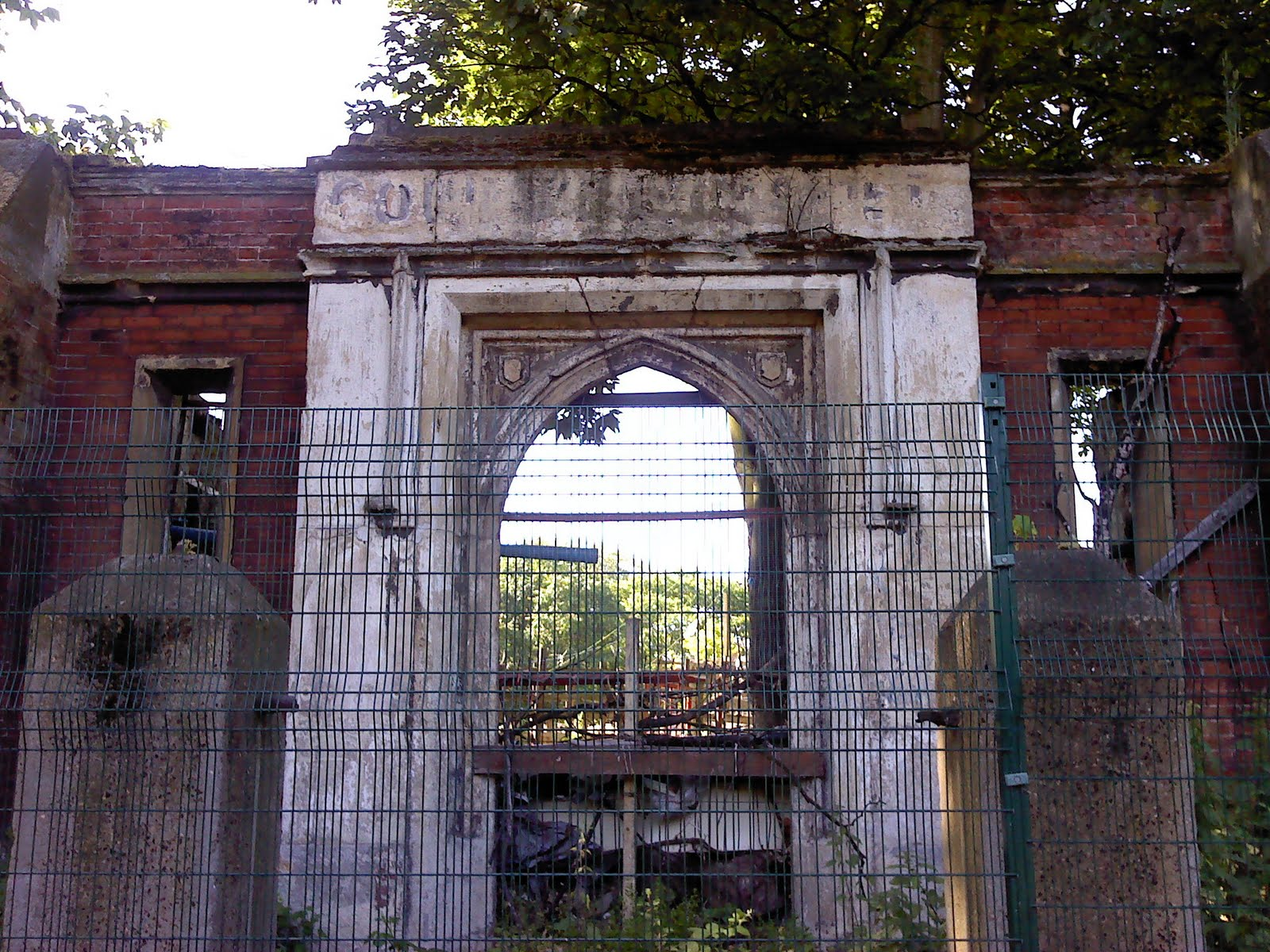
A 2010 photograph showing the remains of the Chapel frontage

The Baptist College, Stepney, was opened in Stepney in the East End of London in 1810 by the Particular Baptists. Its buildings included rooms for tutors and students, a refectory, a library and a chapel. The college relocated to larger premises at Holford House in 1856 and became Regent's Park College.

The only remaining structure is the largely-destroyed Baptist Academical Institution chapel. The building remained until it was damaged during World War II; only three parts of the college estate remain.

The site is currently part of the Stepney City Farm. Crossrail works are taking place there.
