= Benjamin Keach =

English Baptist theologian, minister, and writer

The Reverend Benjamin Keach
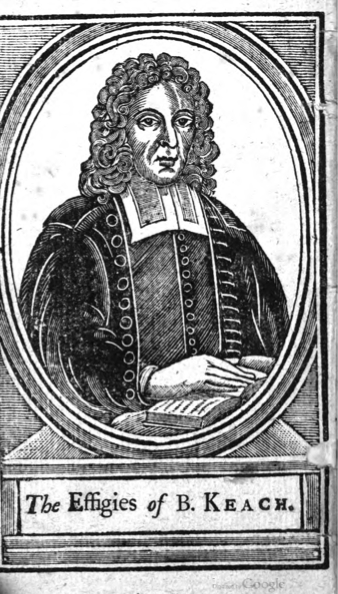
- Born: 29 February 1640; Buckinghamshire, England
- Died: 18 July 1704 (aged 64); London, England
- Occupation: minister
- Spouses: Jane Grove (m. 1660; died 1670) Susanna Partridge (m. 1672–1704)
- Children: Mary (b. 1663); Elias (b. c. 1665); Hannah (b. 1667); Elisabeth (b. 1673); Susanah (b. 1674); Rachel (b. 1679); Rebecca (b. 1682); Three others

Benjamin Keach (29 February 1640 – 18 July 1704) was an English Baptist minister and author whose name was given to Keach's Catechism.

== Biography ==
Keach was born on 29 February 1640 to John and Fedora Keeche at Stoke Hammond, Buckinghamshire. His parents were poor. Keach worked as a tailor during his early years. He was baptized at the age of 15 by John Russell, the minister of an Arminian Baptist church at Chesham, Buckinghamshire. In 1659, at the age of 18, Keach began preaching, and was the minister of the congregation at Winslow. The next year, the Stuart Restoration returned Charles II to the throne of England, and in the years that followed, the penal laws proscribed Protestant nonconformity. In 1664, Keach was arrested and indicted for publishing a children's catechism, The Child's Instructor. The Instructor, since lost, was alleged to be schismatical. In October, he was tried in Aylesbury before Sir Robert Hyde, and was sentenced to two weeks' imprisonment, fined twenty pounds, and on two days was pilloried for several hours in Aylesbury and Winslow.

In 1668, Keach moved to London, taking the position of minister of the church at Horsleydown, Southwark. Keach developed Calvinist soteriological views following his move to London, and he became a Reformed (or "Particular") Baptist. Keach remained pastor at the church in Horsleydown for 36 years, until his death in 1704. The congregation later moved its services to the New Park Street Chapel (built in 1833) and then to the Metropolitan Tabernacle (built in 1861) under the pastorship of Charles Spurgeon. In 1673, part of Keach's congregation seceded due to a dispute over congregational singing, and left to form the Maze Pond Church at Old Kent Road.

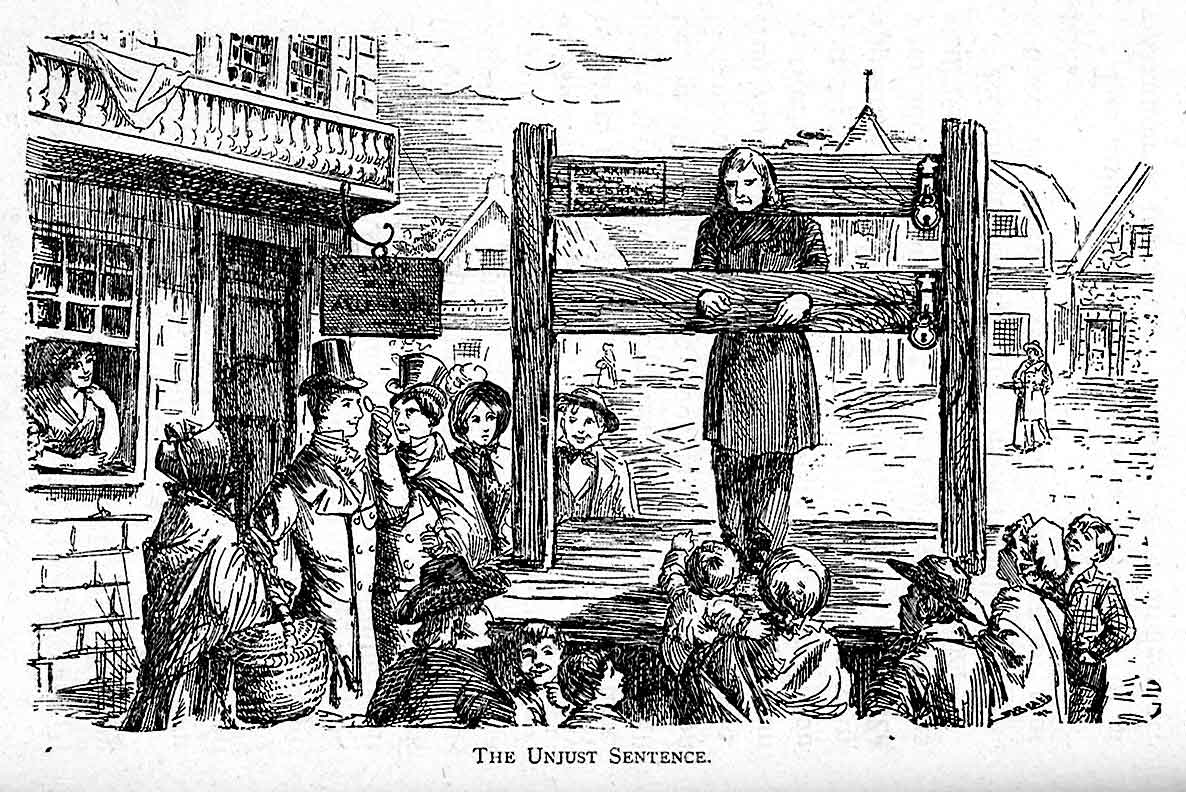
Benjamin Keach was pilloried for writing a catechism.

As a representative of the Horsleydown church, Keach attended the 1689 General Assembly that endorsed the 1689 London Baptist Confession of Faith. Keach was one of the seven men who sent out the invitation to the 1689 General Assembly. The signing of the Confession was no mute doctrinal assent on the part of the church; in the same year they entered into a "Solemn Covenant" which reflected, at the practical and congregational level, some of the doctrines of the confession. Spurgeon later republished the Confession for use in the congregation.

Keach wrote 43 works, of which his Parables and Metaphors of Scripture may be the best known. His catechism The Child's Instructor, as noted, was the ground of his arrest and imprisonment in 1664. He is also attributed with the writing of a catechism commonly known as Keach's Catechism, although its authorship is now disputed, and it was likely authored at least in part by William Collins.

On the pillory at Aylesbury Mr. Keach defended himself and the truth with great boldness. The jailer frequently interrupted him. and finally the sheriff himself threatened to have him gagged. The people, contrary to custom, had no words of mockery for the good, persecuted minister, and no offensive missile was hurled at him. An Episcopal minister who ventured to assail Mr. Keach in the pillory was immediately reproached by the people with the ungodliness of his own life, and his voice was drowned in laughter. At Winslow, where he lived, he suffered the same shameful penalty, and a copy of his little book was burned.

Keach is also known to have promoted the introduction of hymn singing in the Baptist churches. His church, Horsleydown, was probably the first church in England to sing hymns, as opposed to psalms and paraphrases. Keach's hymnbook, published in 1691, provoked heated debate in the 1692 Assembly of Particular Baptists, as it conflicted with the position of exclusive psalmody.

Keach's eschatological beliefs were also controversial in his lifetime. His remarks regarding the second coming of Christ may have led to suspicions that he was a Fifth Monarchy man. Also among his eschatological convictions, Keach anticipated a major revival amongst the Jews at the end of the present age.

== Personal life ==
Keach was twice married. In May 1660, he married Jane Grove of Winslow in the town of Southwark. Keach and his first wife had four daughters and one son. In October 1670, Grove died, aged thirty. In 1672, Keach married again, to Susanna Partridge of Rickmansworth. Partridge and Keach had five daughters, and remained wedded for thirty-two years. Keach died on July 18, 1704, and was buried in a Baptist burial ground in Southwark. Partridge survived him, and lived until 1727.

== Works ==
- The Glory of a True Church, and Its Discipline Display’d, London: John Robinson (1697)
- The Progress of Sin, Or the Travels of Ungodliness, London: J. Clarke (5th edition, 1736)
- The Travels of True Godliness, Boston: Lincoln & Edmands (Revised and Improved, 1831)
- Gold Refin’d, or, Baptism in Its Primitive Purity, London: Printed for the author. (1689)
- An Exposition of the Parables and Express Similitudes of Our Lord and Saviour Jesus Christ, London: Aylott and Co. (1858)
- Spiritual Songs: Being the Marrow of the Scripture, in Songs of Praise to Almighty God; From the Old and New Testament, London: John Marshal (Second Edition, 1700)
- The Baptist Catechism, Commonly Called Keach's Catechism: Or, a Brief Instruction in the Principles of the Christian Religion, Philadelphia: American Baptist Publication Society. (1851)
- Tropologia: A Key to Open Scripture Metaphors, London: William Hill Collingridge (1856)
- The Marrow of True Justification, or, Justification without Works London: Dorman Newman (1692)
- War with the Devil; or the Young Man's Conflict with the Powers of Darkness; Displayed in a Poetical Dialogue between Youth and Conscience Coventry: T. Luckman. (n.d.)
- The Scriptures Superior to All Spiritual Manifestations. In H. C. Fish (Ed.), History and Repository of Pulpit Eloquence, Deceased Divines, Containing the Masterpieces (Vol. I), New York: Dodd, Mead & Company. (1856)
- A Golden Mine Opened: Or, the Glory of God's Rich Grace Displayed in the Mediator to Believers: And His Direful Wrath against Impenitent Sinners: Containing the Substance of near Forty Sermons upon Several Subjects, London: Printed for the author (1694)

Religious titles
Preceded by William Rider	Pastor of the Baptist Church at Horsleydown; 1668-1704	Succeeded by Benjamin Stinton
