= Moot hill =

Assembly place in early medieval Britain

A moot hill or mons placiti (statute hill) is a hill or mound historically used as an assembly or meeting place, as a moot hall is a meeting or assembly building, also traditionally to decide local issues. In early medieval Britain, such hills were used for "moots", meetings of local people to settle local business. Among other things, proclamations might be read; decisions might be taken; court cases might be settled at a moot. Although some moot hills were naturally occurring features or had been created long before as burial mounds, others were purpose-built.

== Etymology ==
Although the word moot or mote is of Old English origin, deriving from the verb to meet, it has come to have a wider meaning throughout the United Kingdom; initially referring to any popular gathering.

In England, the word folkmoot in time came to mean a more specific local assembly with recognised legal rights. In Scotland the term is used in the literature for want of any other single accepted term.

The Scottish Gaelic place name "Tom a' Mhòid" translates as "the hill of the court". The Gaelic form has the familiar Gaelic word "mòd" in the context of the annual cultural event, a "gathering", but in this context, one for judgement and possible execution. The term is cognate with the English word "moot".

== Siting and purpose ==
Many moot, "mote" or "mute" hills are known by that name today. Others have local names such as Court Hill, Judges Hill, Justice Hill, Judgement Hill, Mount, Munt, Moat Hill, Tandle, Downan, Bonfire Hill, Cuthill, etc. Many are also associated with names such as Knol, knock, knowe, or law.

Many other names are used for prominent earthworks, depending to some extent on their location within the United Kingdom, and some of them are known to have served as moot hills at some point in their existence. Terms include Tumulus, how, howe, low, tump, cnwc, pen, butt, toot, tot, cop, mount, mound, hill, knoll, mot, moot, knol, motte, and druid hill. Often the names are combined, as in Knockenlaw, Law Mount, etc.

Some hills known today as "moot hills" were actually historically mottes (from an unrelated French word meaning "mound"), the remains of a motte-and-bailey castle. (In this fortification, a wooden or stone keep was built atop a small mound, usually man-made, which was in turn surrounded by a ditch and an outer ward called the "bailey".) In some cases a mound built as a motte may have seen later use as a functioning moot hill.

Moots may have met on existing archaeological mound sites such as tumuli or mottes; others on entirely natural mounds such as the one at Mugdock or natural mounds which were modified for the intended purpose. One common aid to identification is size: most moot hills, in addition to lacking signs of defensive walls and ditches, are smaller than most mottes.

Some known moot hill sites are surrounded by water, such as Mugdock, Mound Wood and Court Hill at the Hill of Beith; others may well have been, such as Hutt Knowe. Such inaccessibility would have required the use of a boat or raised walkway. Wood Mound is clearly man-made and therefore the relationship between these sites and water may have had some functional or religious significance.

=== Cuthills ===
These were places of assembly in early medieval times, mostly in northern Scotland. The term (also Couthil or Cuthil) is found as a placename element at over sixty sites and many are associated with medieval shires or thanages. The term does not suggest a hill or mound site, being derived from the Gaelic term 'comhdhail', a place of assembly. Such assemblies were non-seignoral burlaw courts and dealt with minor disputes.

=== Francis Grose ===
Francis Grose in 1797 published his 'Antiquities of Scotland', and going from the 1789 date of the numerous engravings this was a little over forty years from the abolition of this aspect of the feudal system. Grose states mote hills, or places for administration of public justice, for considerable districts; and courts hills, whereon the ancient lairds held their baronial courts, before the demolition of the feudal system. These mote and court hills serve to explain the use of these high mounts still remaining near our ancient castles. He goes on to say –

In ancient times, courts for the administration of justice were generally held in the open fields, and judgement was both given and executed in the same place; in every earldom, and almost every barony and jurisdiction of any considerable extent, there was a particular place allotted for that purpose; it was generally a small eminence, either natural or artificial, near the principal Mansion-house and was called the mote hill, or in Latin, mons placiti. In that place all the vassals of the jurisdiction were obliged to appear at iwdain times; and the superior gave judgement in such cases as fell within the powers committed to him by law or custom; in the same spot too, the gallows was erected for the execution of capital offenders; hence these places commonly go by the name of the Gallows Knoll; near the royal palaces there was usually a mote hill, where all the freeholders of the kingdom met together, both to transact public offices, and to do homage to their sovereign, who was seated on the top of the eminence. The mote hill at Scoons this day universally known. It is highly probable the Hurly Heaky (named after the sport of sliding down a slope on a trough or sledge; tobogganing) was the mote hill of the Castle of Sterling, or perhaps of a much larger jurisdiction. In 1360, a deadly feud which had long subsisted between the Drummonds and Menteaths, at that time two of the most powerful families in Perthshire, and which had heen the cause of much rapine and bloodshed, was composed by the interposition of Sir Robert Erskine and Sir Hugh Eglington, the two great justiciaries of the nation, in the neighbourhood, if not on the very mount. Our authority says, Super ripam aquae de Forth juxta Strivelyn. This mode of distributing justice appears to have been the custom of almost all nations, in the more early days of their state; and that it only to give their judicial procedures a greater appearance of impartiality and justice, by being carried on in public view, but because there were not houses large enough to contain the numbers that usually attended them. The court of Areopagus, at Athens, sat for many years after its first institution, in the open air.

Grose records that the last instance of a Baron Baillie sentencing and carrying out a death sentence in Nithsdale was at Barnside Hill in around 1697. Sir Robert Grierson, Bart was the baron concerned and the victim was a sheep stealer.

== Origins ==
It is known that in Scotland, Brehons or Judges administered justice from 'Court Hills', especially in the highlands, where they were called a tomemoid (from Scots Gaelic tom a' mhòid) – that is, the Court Hillock. In ancient times suitable buildings would rarely have existed and there was usually no alternative other than to use an outdoor gathering place. It is said that Irish colonists brought with them Brehon law, the use of Moot hills and the law of tanistry. Every baron had a moot hill and the chartularies of religious houses record that they too used moot hills for holding courts.

The moot hills' part in the practice of law derives from the introduction of feudalism by the Normans in England or in Scotland by the Scottish kings such as David I 1125–1153 who introduced feudalism and delegated very extensive jurisdiction over large areas of land to men like the Walter the Steward (Renfrew & the northern half of Kyle) or de Morville (Cunningham) and they in turn delegated quite extensive powers to their own vassals. These invitees, largely of Norman, Fleming and Breton origin were, under feudal charter, given significant grants of land, were invited and did not come as conquerors as had been the case in England. There were in certain instances a close connection between the old Celtic thaneages (a hereditary non-military tenant of the crown) and the new feudal baronies.

There was therefore no wholesale displacement of native lords in Scotland. In 1200 all the earls north of Forth and Clyde were still of Celtic descent; and as late as 1286, eight of the earldoms in Scotland were still in the hands of those of native stock. Many native lords were granted or confirmed in their lands in feudal form. Within a few generations, regular intermarriage and the Wars of Independence had removed most of the differences between native and incomer, although not those between Highlander and Lowlander.

Burgh courts were held in the open air, round the market cross, a standing stone, a moot hill or a prominent tree. These courts were held three times a year – the chief court after Pasch (Passover or Easter), the next after Michaelmas, when the magistrates or burgh-reeves were elected, and the third after Yule or Christmas. All burgesses were bound to attend.

=== Baronies ===
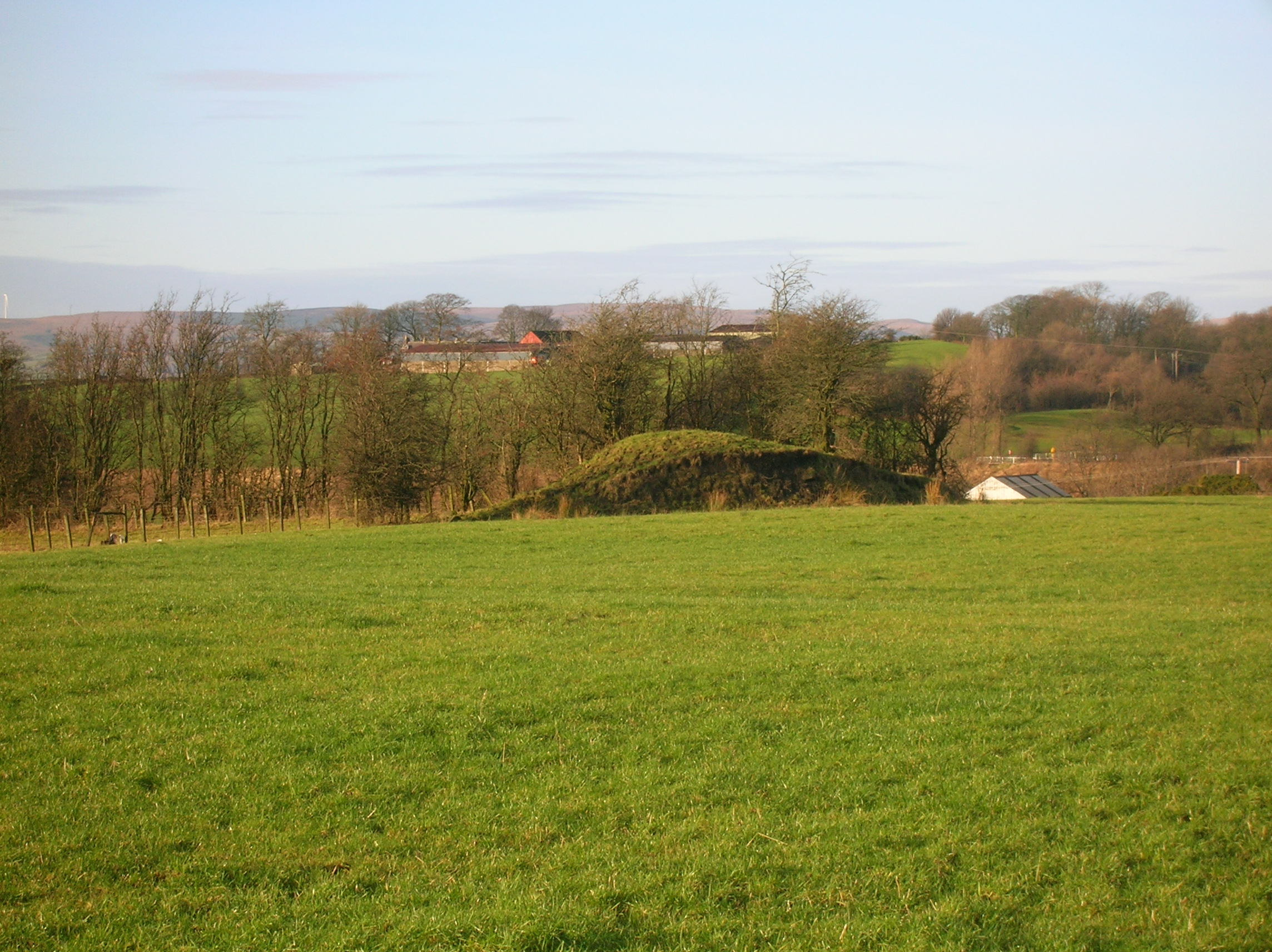
A mound near Greenhill farm in the old Barony of Giffen

A Barony was an area of land, not always contiguous, granted by the Crown to a Tenant. Baronies became a unit in administration and law, however the actual size was variable and they merged or separated from time to time. The holder or Baron had power to hold courts which dealt with civil and criminal cases of less than major importance. Some crimes were reserved for royal courts, namely murder, rape, robbery with violence, fire raising and treason. To come under the jurisdiction of a baronial court, the crime had to have been committed within the barony or concerned its people or property.

In England a Baron was a peerage title. This was not the case in Scotland. He or she held the land directly from the King or Queen. After c. 1700 the emphasis was on administration, a good neighbourhood and economic and other rules for the benefit of those living within the Barony. In 1747 the criminal jurisdiction of a Baron Court was much restricted. The Barony was largely a self-governing community, however there was a system of appeals to the Sheriff and the Central Courts.

The term baron had simply meant "man" originally; later the term baron came to imply holding the barony lands immediately of the King. Finally baron came to mean one who held such lands "of the King" with accompanying rights and duties and therefore the word came to mean one who held as 'tenant in chief' of the King's lands erected by Charter 'in free barony'. Sir John Skene in his glossary of Scots legal terms defines it as In this Realme he is called ane Barrone quha haldis his landes immediatlie in chiefe of the King and hes power of pit and gallow. The Barons of Scotland continued to have the right to sit in the Scottish Parliament until 1594.

==== Baronial courts ====
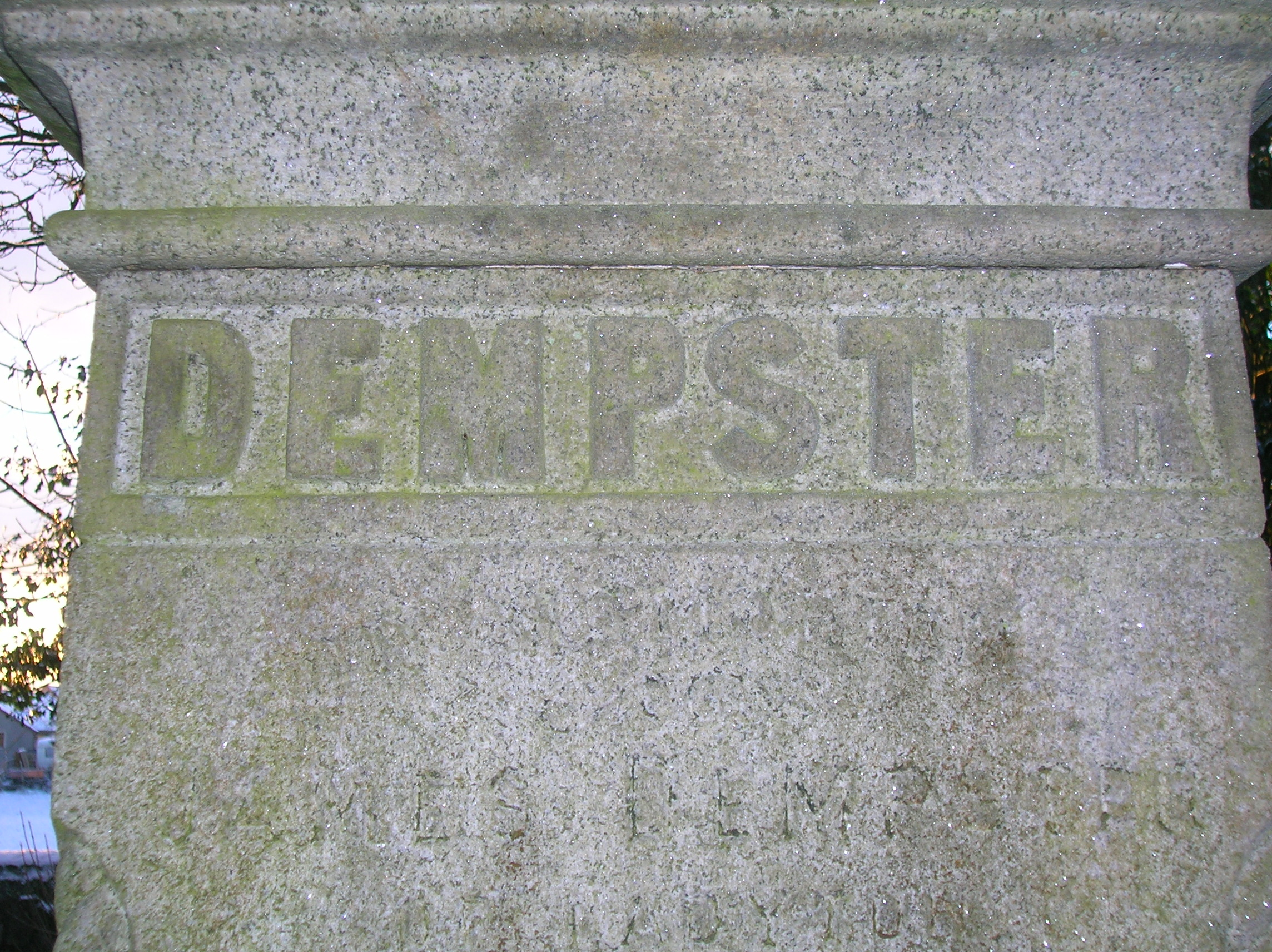
Gravestone to a Dempster

Baronies were social units and their courts a form of council which enabled the area of the barony to function effectively as an early form of self-government. In mediaeval law the barony required a principal residence at which the legal process could be formally transacted. Many abandoned castles motes therefore continued in use for this purpose. The baron and the baron baillie, his deputy, and the council, were concerned with such matters as: responsibility for repair to ditches and hedges, assessment of damage caused by cattle found on another's ground, under thirlage laws, the maintenance of the mill race in good order and free from weeds and the mending of the mill dam. Even cases of neighbours using "unreasonable language", and "miscalling one another" were brought before the court. The court might also regulate the rotation of crops and the manuring of the ground. Ecclesiastical courts also existed as shown by the example of the Abbot of Kilwinning's court hill near Beith. Three times a year the baron also had the right to clear his lands of evildoers and men of ill repute.

The feudal Baron appointed the Officers of a Baron Court. Barons therefore had public law executive and judicial authority over the public affairs of that Barony. The officers were:

- The Baron-Baillie was the principal administrative officer; the Baillie's insignia of office was a Cap of Justice, a Black legal Robe, and a medal of office on a chain
- The Baron-Clerk acted as administrative secretary of the Barony.
- The Dempster or Deemster was responsible for executing the judicial decisions and announced the "doom" as the sentence was called.
- The Baron-Sergeant kept order, summoned the parties involved and enforced civil decrees of the Court; the Sergeant's insignia of office was a 37" white Ellwand and a Horn to summon attendance.
- The Procurator Fiscal operated as the civil and criminal prosecutor in matters before the Baron Court.

By the Heritable Jurisdictions (Scotland) Act 1746 the powers of life and death were removed from the Baron Court and the criminal jurisdiction was very significantly reduced but not entirely abolished. The hereditary jurisdictions of Regality Courts and of the Sheriff Courts were abolished and the owners received significant sums in compensation. It can be stated therefore that most moot and gallow hills ceased to have a role in the judicial process at that time.

The Abolition of Feudal Tenure etc. (Scotland) Act 2000 removed all the remaining aspects of the feudal baronial system, apart from the baronial titles themselves. The entire system whereby land was held by a vassal on perpetual tenure from a superior, was, on this appointed day, abolished.

==== Pit and gallows ====
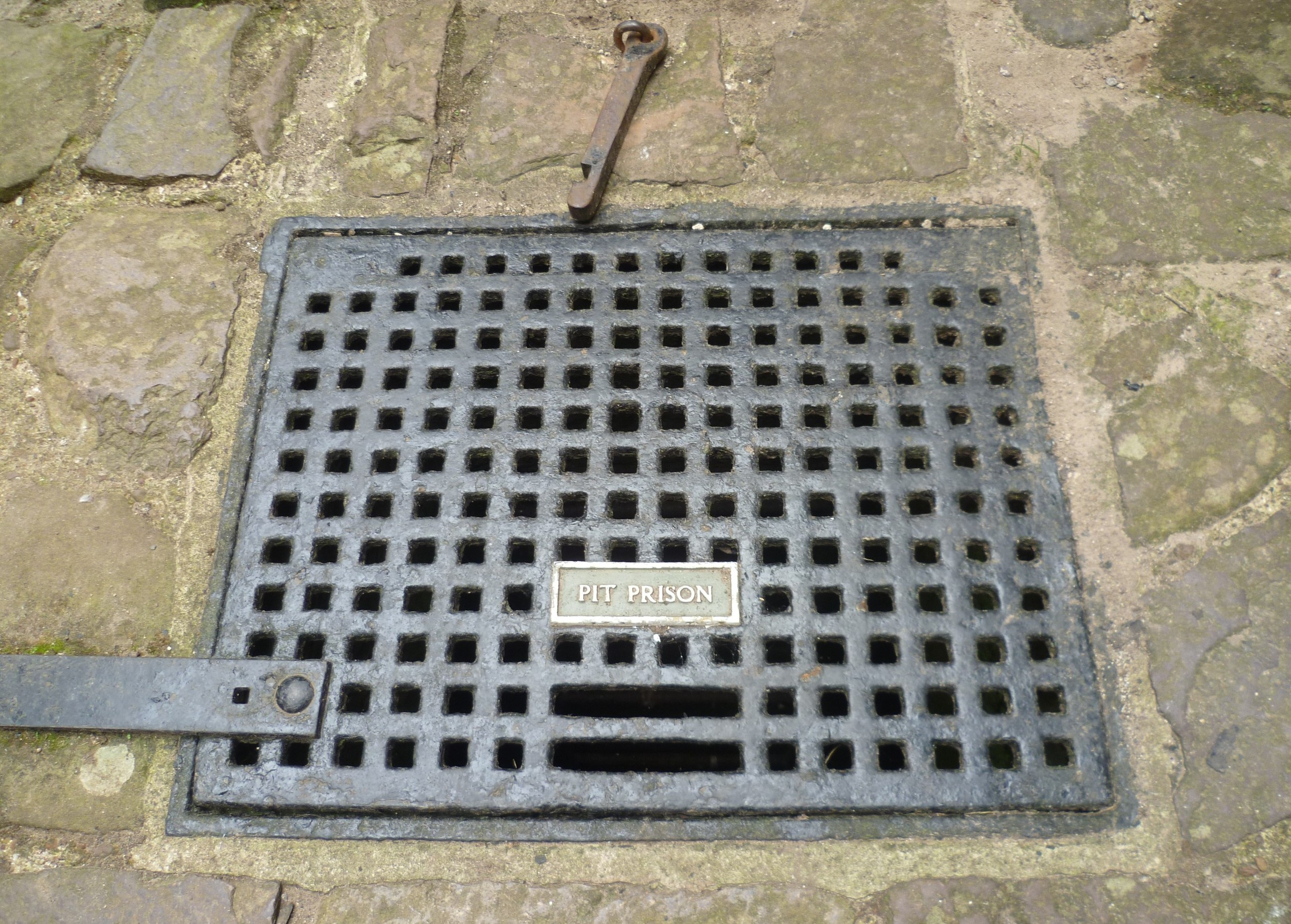
One of the two pit prisons in Hailes Castle, East Lothian

It was enacted at the parliament assembled in Forfar in 1057 by King Malcolm Canmore that every baron should erect a gibbet (gallows) for the execution of male criminals, and sink a well or pit, for the drowning of females. The term pit and gallows described the jurisdiction of a baron in criminal cases; in full 'pit and gallows, sake and soke, thane, bluidewite, toll, team, infangthieff and outfangthieff'. 'Sock' was the power to hold courts; 'sack' was the right to enforce fines; 'thane' was the right to possess and dispose of slaves; 'bluidewite' allowed for cases of bloodshed being tried; 'infangthieff' and 'outfangthieff' referred to the punishment of thieves from inside the barony and from other baronies.

Some historians claimed that a pit was a dungeon or prison cell, not a pit for drowning the condemned. Others take the view that the pit was the drowning pit for women. It is not clear why men were more likely to be hanged and women drowned in a fen, river, pit or 'murder hole'; however, it may relate to ideas of decency. The place name 'Muttonhole' is not infrequently found, and one suggestion is that it is derived from 'mort-toun-hole', another of the names for a drowning pit. At Cumnock in East Ayrshire, women were placed in a sack and the mouth was tied; in other cases the condemned had to walk down a ladder that was then withdrawn. Many moot hills are near rivers or wetlands. It was often the case that barony courts were not keen on imposing death sentences due to the expense of carrying out the sentence and banishment was a cheaper option.

In Norse law, the reason was that men were sent to Wodan, and women were given to Ran (a sea goddess) or Hel. In Norse tradition, the pit and gallows stood on the west of the moot-places or the prince's hall ready for use.

The binomial expressions 'furca and fossa' and 'pit and gallows' refer to the high justice including the capital penalty. The furca was a device of punishment in ancient Rome and refers to the gallows for hanging men; the fossa was a pit for the drowning of women. As previously stated, the hereditary right of high justice survived until 1747, when it was removed from the barons and from the holders of regalities and sheriffdoms, by the Heritable Jurisdictions (Scotland) Act 1746.

It is not clear that the moot hill was also the actual site of executions; folklore, tradition and the association of separate 'gallow' places names with moot hills on balance suggests that the usual place of execution was a separate 'gallows hill'. At Gardyne Law (Gardyne Castle's moot hill), however, an eyewitness recalled that judgement and execution took place on the same law. It does seems unlikely that in those superstitious days, meetings would be held at places of death. At Mugdock, separate moot and gallow hills are a good example. Such gallows may have been built of worked timber or a Dule Tree may have been used. RCAHMS records show that human bones have been frequently found in association with 'gallows' place name sites, but not at 'moot' sites. The term 'murder hole' may relate to the drowning sites, bones have been found close to some of these.

==== The standard of justice ====
An Ayrshire story tells of how an Ayrshire baron once strung up an innocent man, just because his visitor had never seen a man hanged before. Hopefully this was an isolated example, however the system suffered from many faults due to bias, lack of legal training, etc., etc. As stated, a right of appeal to Regalities and sheriffdoms courts did exist. Details of the sometimes shocking excesses of baron bailies can make painful reading. As their power was great and generally abused, so many of them enriched themselves. They had many ways of making money for themselves, such as (1) the bailie's darak, as it was called, or a day's labour in the year from every tenant on the estate; (2) confiscations, as they generally seized on all the goods and effects of such as suffered capitally; (3) all fines for killing game, blackfish, or cutting green wood were laid on by themselves, and went into their own pockets. These fines amounted to what they pleased almost. (4) Another very lucrative perquisite they had was what was called the Herial Horse, which was the best horse, cow, ox, or other article which any tenant on the estate possessed at the time of his death. This was taken from the widow and children for the bailie, at the time they had most need of assistance. This amounted to a great deal of extra income for the baillie of a large barony.

== Summoning people to the moot ==
At times it would be necessary to summon people to come to the mote for judgement, proclamations, gatherings, etc. This was sometimes done by ringing a bell, which was fitted upon or beside the moot hill, especially when a date for the meeting had not been previously set. At Greenhills near Barrmill in North Ayrshire a different method is said to have been employed, namely that of raising a flag at the Bore stone; a prominent site near the moot hill. It is likely that bonfires would have been lit as a signal, either from the smoke during the day or the light at night. A 'Bonfire hill' place name survives at Stewarton in East Ayrshire and a 'Bonfire knowe' is recorded at Kilmarnock. The Tarbolton moot was still used for lighting bonfires up until the 19th-century at least and the name Shinny Hill is suggestive of traditional bonfires; a 'Shinicle' being a halloween bonfire.

== Links with the land ==
The significance of direct links with the land is shown by the standing on 'home' soil at the Scone moot, the use of soil from each parish in the building of the Tynwald Hill and the discovery of soil from several distant locations at the centre of Silbury Hill. This practice may link with beliefs that lay behind the ceremonies at the petrosomatoglyph footprints on Dunadd and at other sites.

In the 15th century the Tinwald Mote near Dumfries was still the legal head of the barony, where sasine (possession) was given by the ceremony of handing the grantee, before witnesses, a handful of earth and stone from the head messuage called the Mote near the church of Tynwald. In mediaeval law the barony required a principal residence at which the legal process could be formally transacted, which explains why many such motes as that at Ellon were retained, here by the earls of Buchan, when little else remained of their possessions in the district. The mote still carried the dignity of the earldom.

The sasine is the legal act of register of land ownership, pronounced sayseen. In the context of the significance of the physical aspect of soil and stone, the act of conferring sasine was originally (for example in 1615) effected by the handing over of a bowl full of earth from the land and / or a stone of the house by the proprietor or seller to his heir or the buyer, who was then said to be seized of the land or house. Likewise the land rent payable was symbolised by the passing of a bowl of grass and the tithe as a bowl full of grain. The act of homage for holding a fief also involved the act of investiture. enacted by the delivering of a turf or a handful of earth to the individual to whom the land was being granted.

== The demise of moot hills ==
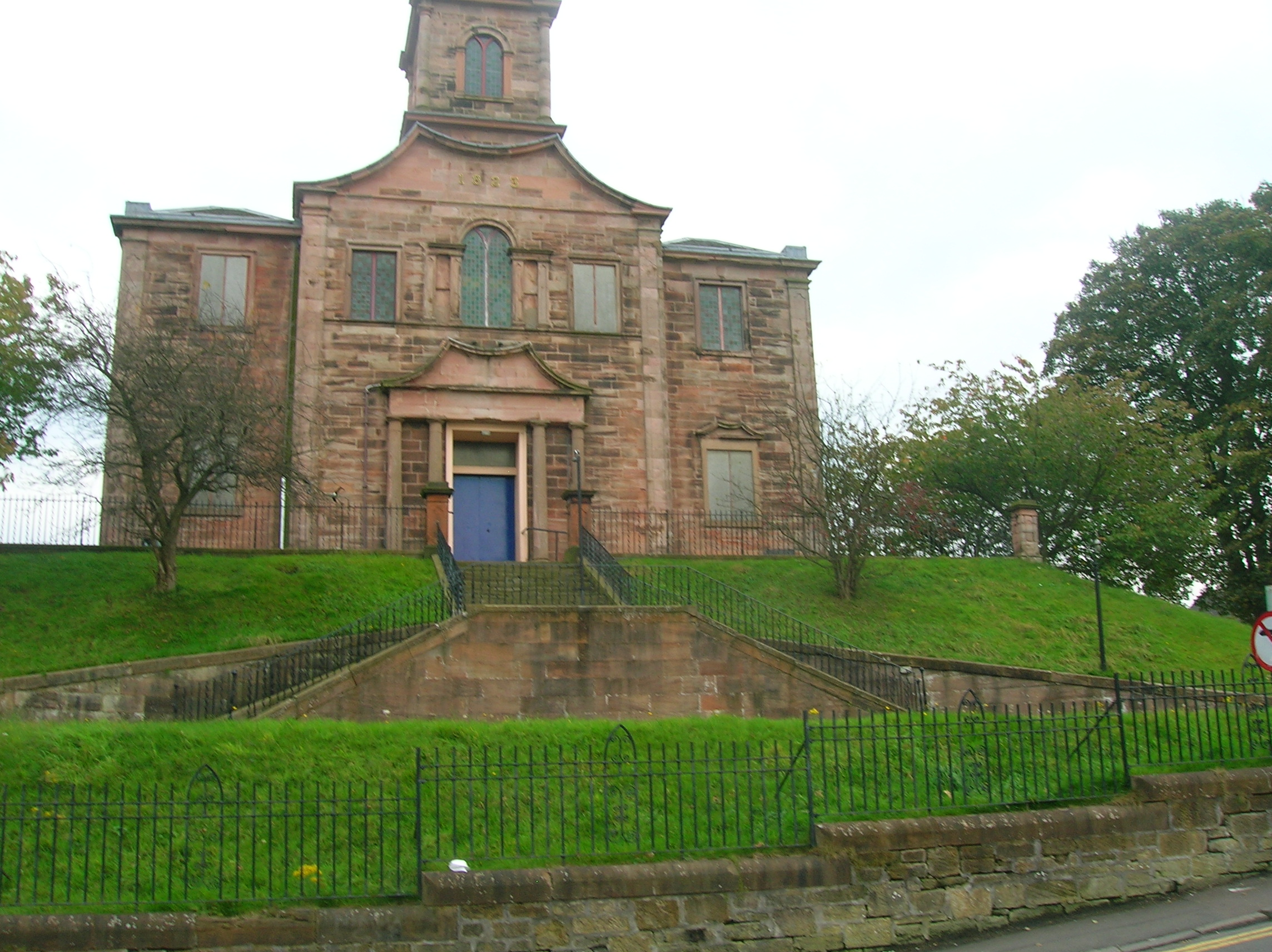
The old judgement hill at Riccarton, now topped by a church.

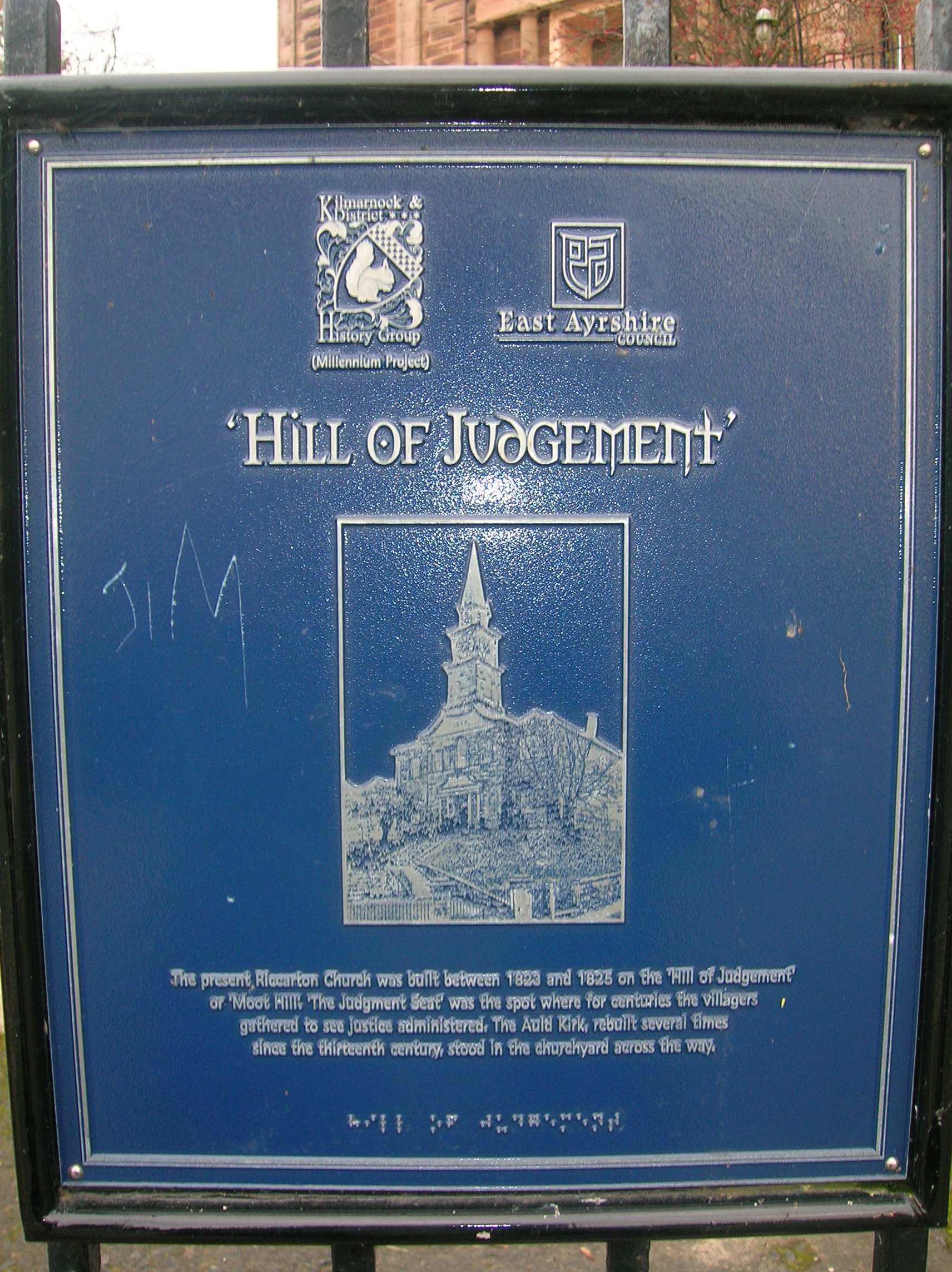
The historical plaque for the old judgement hill at Riccarton.

In Scotland feudalism and its bonds of allegiance to the local laird was associated with the Jacobite risings with the result that the Hanoverian Government took steps to undermine the system. After 1747 the moot hill was not used as a part of the baronial court process and the requirement for a gathering place for soldiers was also a thing of the past. The construction of Moot halls did away with the need to meet in the outdoors. Moot hills gradually ceased to have any significant role and many have suffered the final ignomy of being ploughed out and their existence almost or actually forgotten. Place names and local folklore have preserved the memory of a few, however records suggest that the majority have been destroyed. A few moot hills ended up with unlikely secondary uses, such as Knockenlaw, which was used as the 'blast wall' for a gunpowder magazine and Chapel Hill which was used as a viewing point for watching horse racing.

A few, notably the Tynwald Hill in the Isle of Man, continue to have a function in the 21st century. Some were built on and took on a new role, such as the moot hill at Riccarton near Kilmarnock, which had a kirk (church) built on it in 1823.

=== Locating old moot hills ===
Many barony lands were merged with other baronies at one time or other and therefore some of the associated moot hills would have ceased to have a role well before the demise of the baronial courts in 1747. Moot hills in this category may have remained as features of the landscape, but often without any local traditions relating to them being recorded. Place names are a guide, especially if local traditions have survived as well. Written records often survive, such as in 1346 a William Baillie, the Baillie of Lambistoun or Lambimtoun, vulgarly called Lamington is listed by Dalrymple amongst the prisoners taken by the English at the Battle of Durham which had taken place on 17 October of that year. He was in the company of a Thomas Boyd of Kilmarnock and Andrew Campbell of Loudoun. This helps to confirm that modern day Lambroughton was a barony. Pre-reformation and other old gravestones often recorded the occupation of the individual, especially if they had held important roles such a baron baillie.

== A list of moot hills, gallows hills, murder holes, their associated baronies and other details ==
Records of these sites have often been lost & therefore the barony and other associations have only been made where the evidence is credible, backed up by written records, place names or by oral folklore.

=== Scotland ===
==== Aberdeenshire ====
- Court Hill (NJ 7075 4603), Braefoot. A small conical hill, entirely cultivated, situated on the south-west side of Braefoot. Tradition affirms this to have originally been an ancient seat of the baronial court hence the name. 57.5035°N 2.4898°W
- Gallowhill, Banff. In 1700 a Freebooter, James McPherson, was locked up in the tollbooth before being hanged. The clock in Banff was reputedly put forward one hour to ensure he was hanged before any possible reprieve arrived. He may have been hanged on the gallowhill.
- Gallows Hill (NK 065 365). Parish of Cruden. A small hill where criminals were executed and where human skeletons have been found. A deep pool in the Water of Cruden opposite is where others were drowned. The moot hill must have been nearby. 57.4188°N 1.8934°W
- Moat-head, Auchterless. Near the parish church. The Gallow hill is nearby. 57.4629°N 2.4784°W
- Moot Hill, Ellon. The site of the court of the Celtic Mormaers and the Norman Earls of Buchan is located next to the Riverside car park and today is marked with a small monument and seating area. 57.36675°N 2.06815°W

==== Angus ====
- Courthill (NO 6740 5140). Parish of Lunan. The nearby farm preserves the name of the moot hill where the barons of Red Castle held their courts. 56.6533°N 2.5333°W
- Court Hillock (NO 3798 5415), Kirriemuir. The Court Hillock, called a 'mote' in 1909, had been levelled by 1884. 56.67498°N 3.01374°W
- Gallows Knowe, Lintrathen. This artificial mound is about 45 yards in diameter and between 12 and 15 feet (4.6 m) high. Three stone cists have been found within the knowe.
- Gardyne Law, near Gardyne Castle, 1 1/4 miles (2.0 km) southwest of Friockheim and 3 miles (4.8 km) east of Letham. An old man told Thomas Lyel, Esq., that he saw two Highlanders, taken with stolen cattle, judged, condemned, and hanged on the Law of Gardyne.

==== Argyll and Bute ====
- Court Hills or Gallowhill (NS 3521 8793). Parish of Luss. About 1 3/4 miles from Rossdhu, are two natural mounds which were formerly the Courthill and Gallowshill of the Clan Colquhoun and the barony of Luss may still be seen near the gamekeeper's house about 2 miles (3 km) from Rossdhu. 56.0558°N 4.64790°W
- Tom a' Mhòid or the Hill of the Court (NS2587). Shandon. Faslane Castle was the early caput or base of the mormaers of Lennox. An ancient dun close to Tom a' Mhòid, may have been an earlier seat of power. The Scottish Gaelic "Sean Dùn", "Old Dun" could have been anglicised as "Shandon". The hill could have been the gallow hill or the hill where the mormaer's court met.

==== Ayrshire (East) ====
- Bowie's Munt – Kilmaurs, East Ayrshire. A large wooded mound on the outskirts of the village, surrounded by a circular ditch and bank. The farms nearby are known are Knocklandside and Knocklandhill. 55.3818°N 4.3234°W
- Castle Lowrie – Barony of Loudoun, Darvel. Recorded as a natural mote hill, a meeting-place on the Glen Water, near Bankhead Farm.
- Chapel Hill, Chapeltoun, Stewarton. 20 feet (6 m) high on the low side and 7 feet (2.1 m) on the high side. A flat top, 22 paces in diameter. A likely Moot Hill as it is unclear where the chapel stood. Also known as the Monk's graveyard and Jockey's cap, as it was used as a viewing platform to watch horse races at festival times. A Moot Hill of Chapelton is recorded in the Register of the Great Seal of Scotland as being specifically excluded by King James from a grant of lands including Lainshaw, Robertland and Gallowberry to Alexander Hume in the 15th century.55.3953°N 4.32319°W
- Court Hill, a short distance to the south of Aiket Castle. Cunninghame family. Dunlop area. The name applies to the vestiges of a small hill, which appears to have been much higher at one time. It is situated in the corner of a small field near the house called Aiket Mill. Local informants stated that this was where the feues due to the proprietor of Aiket Castle (NS34NE 1) were paid.
- Craighead Lea or Law hill, near Lugton. This is said to have been a place of trial and it had an arrangement of boulders on its summit until a farmer moved them to aid ploughing of the area.
- Craigie Moot – Smith records that a moot hill existed near the village of Craigie.

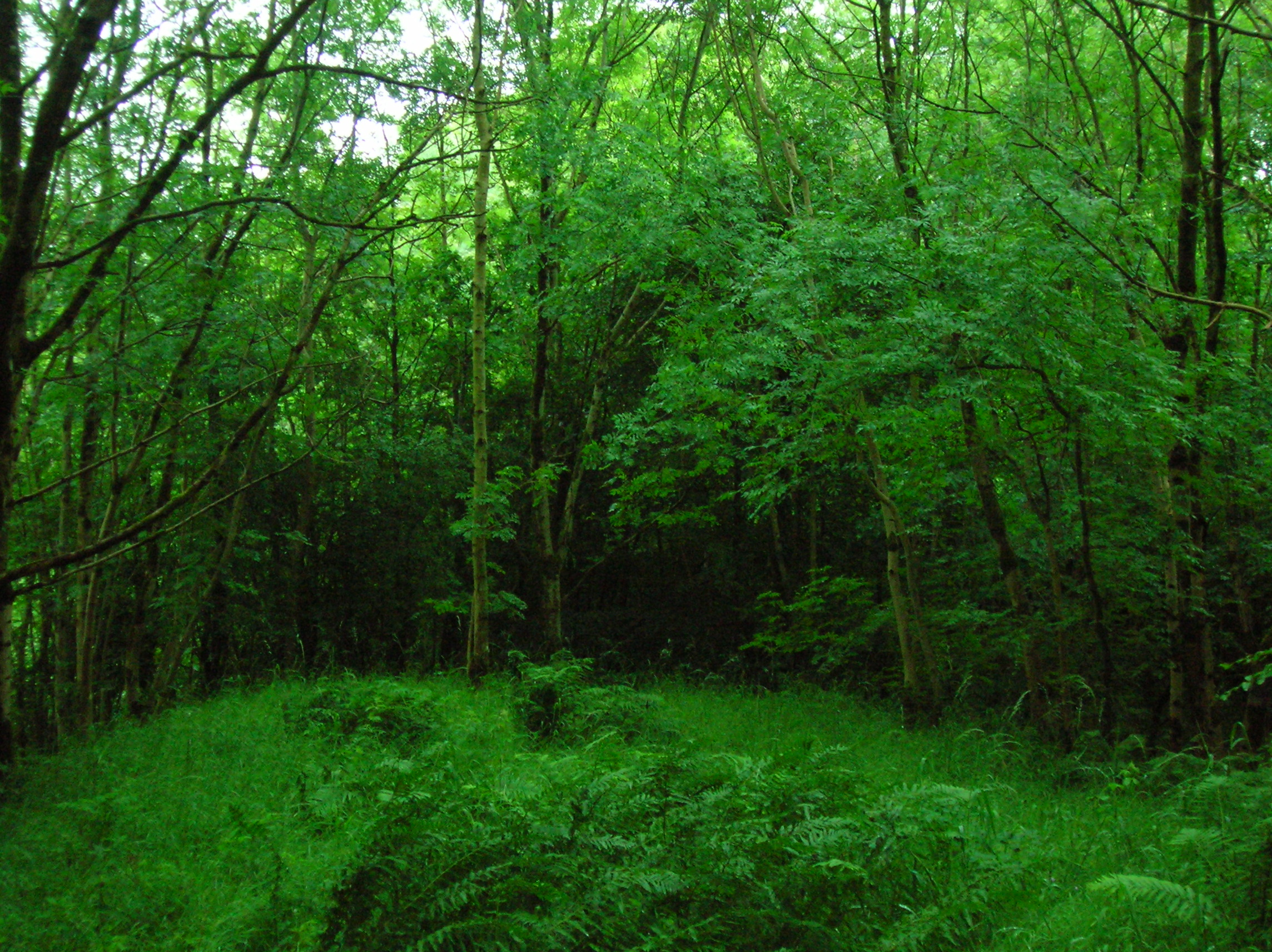
The Judge's Hill near Galston, just visible through the woods.

- Cumnock Moot Hill was located on a peninsular of land that lies in a bend of the River Lugar above the Bank Viaduct on the old G&SWR line to Carlisle. The gallows hill was located nearby at the Martyr's Grave, which is now a cemetery. Cumnock women it seems were placed in a sack which was tied at the mouth and they were then placed into one of the deep pools in the Lugar. No tradition of a drowning pit on dry land has survived.
- Dalmellington Moat Hill (NS 482 058). Dalmellington's mound is 154 paces in circumference at the base, surrounded by a ditch, 9 feet (3 m) broad at the bottom, and 4 feet (1 m) deep. Measured from the bottom of this ditch, the mound is 28 feet (9 m) high; the top is 22 paces in diameter, the sides are very steep. A wooden stairs was fitted to the top in Smith's time (1890s). He records that it may have been a fort at one time as well as being used as a moot hill later. A Gillies Knowe, possibly a corruption of Gallows Knowe, is nearby. 55.3228°N 4.394°W
- Greenhill (NS 401 391), Knockentiber. The base is 140 paces in diameter; it is 15 feet 6 inches (4.72 m) high, and measures 25 opaces across the circular top. 55.6191°N 4.5407°W
- Highlangside Moot hill – Smith records that a moot hill existed here in the Craigie district.

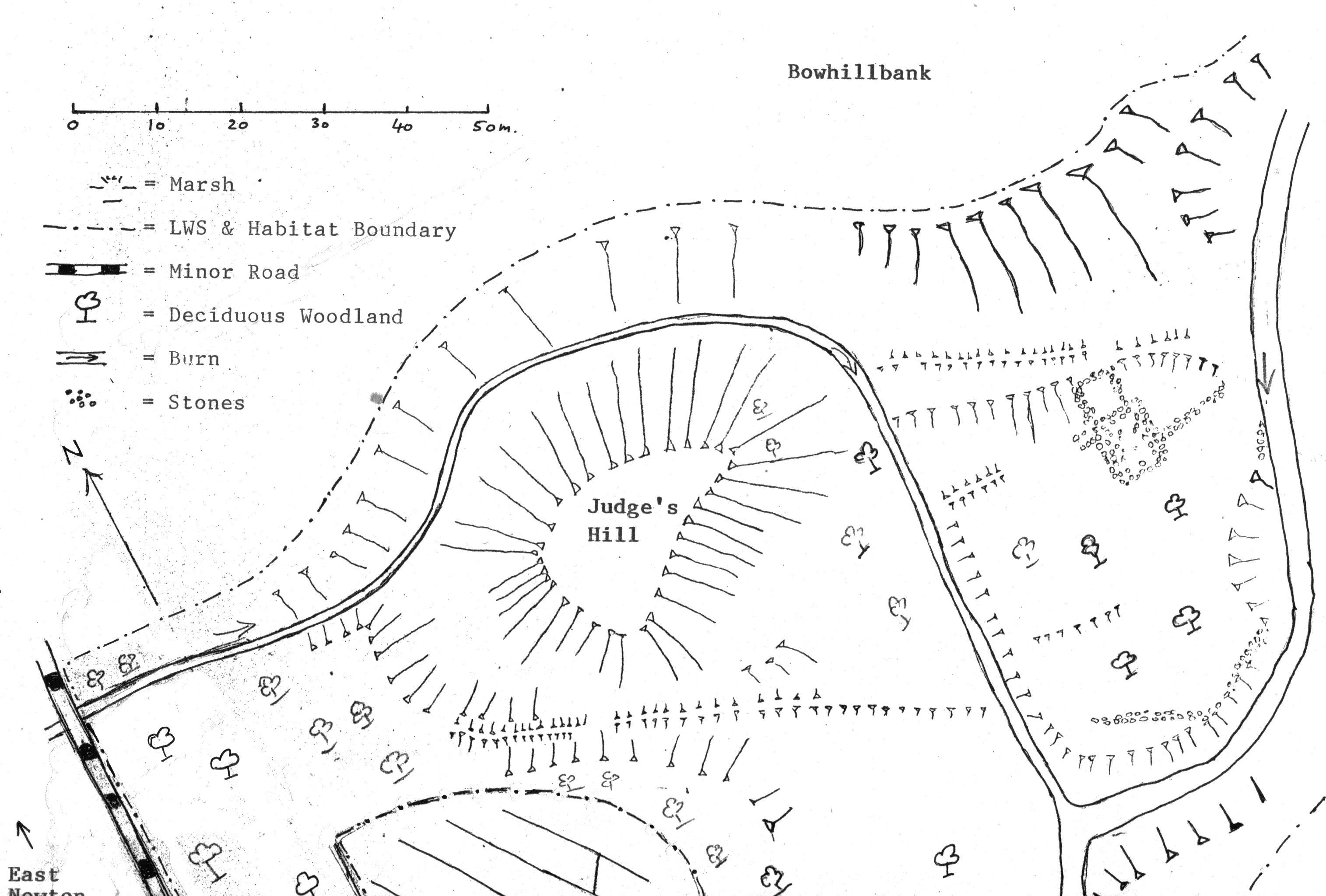
A map of the Judge's Hill site.

- Judge's Hill (NS 519 386) – Barony of Loudoun. Shown on the old OS maps under this name. A possible man made 'Moot Hill' near to the old Loudoun Castle, sometimes called Arclowdun, standing on the Hag Burn. Judge's Hill stands close to the Hag or Bowhill Burn. This may well be the Justice hill for the Campbell's of Earl's of Loudoun. A Gallows Hill is situated near the upper reaches of the Burn Anne above Shinny Hill. Additional evidence is suggested by the name 'Muttonhole Strip' that lies nearby and may derive from 'Mort-toun-hole', the place where women were drowned when sentenced by a barony court.55.61813°N 4.35233°W
- Judgement Seat (NS 463 324), in the Carnell estate woods, Fiveways. It overlooks the Cessnock Water. It is close to the old tower of Cairnhill, now Carnell. The nearby Dollar Hill Mound (Hill of Grief) may have been the Gallows Hill associated with the Judgement Seat. 55.561°N 4.4386°W
- Judgement Seat in Riccarton near Kilmarnock. A Kirk (church), built in 1823, now stands on the old justice mound. 55.5952°N 4.4964°W
- Justice Hill or Judas hill overlooking the Craufurdland Water. Near Dean castle, Kilmarnock. The Boyds, Lords of Kilmarnock, had this moot hill and their gallows was at Gallows-Knowe which stood in Wellington street, Kilmarnock. It is also said to be the burial site of men killed in battle.
- Knockenlaw (NS 425 396), Barony of Roberton, Kilmarnock. A final traditional use of the mound was in the holding of a 'court' at Knockenlaw by the Earl of Glencairn when he was attempting to claim the Lordship of Kilmarnock from the Boyd's. In the event the supporters of the Boyd's turned up in force and the Earl had to abandon his attempt. A powder magazine was later built into the mound, of which little now remains (2007). 55.6244°N 4.5029°W
- Knockmarloch in the Craigie district. Smith records that a moot hill existed here.
- Law Mount (NS 411 447), Barony of Lambroughton and / or Lainshaw by Stewarton. It is also known as Moat Hill or a Moot Hill overlooking Lainshaw House and above Castleton (previously Over or High Castleton). It is an artificial mound which was thought to have a bailey and therefore be a castle motte, hence the name of the farms. Linge is of the opinion that the supposed bailey, clearly visible form the road under the appropriate light conditions, is a natural geographic feature. The mound is 19 m (62 ft) in diameter and 3.5 m (11.5 ft) high. At the top its diameter is 12 m (39 ft) and seen by satellite imagery it is clearly too small to have been a motte. The secondary use of the mound and fits with its more recent local names, is that it was the site of the Justice Hill where proclamations of the Lainshaw Castle or possibly the Lambroughton Baronial Court's judgements were made. 55.6697°N 4.5281°W
- Main Castle, Barony of Loudoun, Darvel. Recorded as an artificial mote hill, a meeting-place in a bend of the Avon Water, where tribal laws were made and open-air courts of justice were held.
- Mote, now Carmelbank farm, Crosshouse. Carmel Bank House was formerly known as 'Mot' or 'Mote' House and was the site of a Moot Hill, possibly for the barony of Thorntoun.
- Shinny Hill (NS 525 367). Galston. A striking hill with a nearby cairn and Gallow Law overlooking it. The Scots name 'Shinicle' refers to a Halloween bonfire, but no local traditions appear to record this activity. Saint Anne's well and the Burn Anne are nearby. 55.6015°N 4.3427°W
- Tinkers Hill. Riccarton, Ayrshire. A wooded mound at the edge of Riccarton Moss that was once the moot hill of the Barony of Haining-Ross.
- Polkelly Castle (NS 4568 4524). The Gallow's Hill of Polkelly Castle was identified by a lone pine tree and King James V is said to have administered justice here with the hanging of 17 men.

==== Ayrshire (North) ====
- Blair Court Hill (NS305481), Dalry. The hill overlooks the Bombo Burn and lies close to the site of the original Blair Castle now represented by Blair House and it lay within the ancient Barony of Blair.
- Castle Knowe (NS20365081), North Kilruskin, West Kilbride.
- Court Hill (NS 292 495), Dalry. Barony of Ardrossan. A barrow and a moot hill. Previously 290 feet (88 m) in circumference, 20 feet (6 m) high and the diameter of the flat top was 38 feet (12 m). Covered in pit refuse and then excavated and the results published. It had a wooden castle on its summit at one point in its history. A Gallow's stone is said to have stood a short distance to the east of the hill.
- Court Hill, near Hill of Beith in the Barony of Beith. Dobie states that the Abbot of Kilwinning used it to administered justice to his vassals & tenants. It is a sub-oval, flat-topped mound, measuring 15.0 by 14.5 metres (49.2 by 47.6 ft) over all, 10.0 by 8.0 metres (32.8 by 26.2 ft) across the top, and 2.0 m (6.6 ft) high, situated at the foot of a small valley. A number of large stones are visible in the sides of the mound. It is turf-covered, and probably situated on a low outcrop, it is mostly an artificial work. It pre-dates the channelling of the burn which detours around it, the mound was probably isolated in this once marshy outflow of the former Boghall Loch (see NS35SE 14). It does not seem to lie in the area identified by Smith.
- Giffordland, Dalry. The small Barony of Giffordland was held by the Giffords and later the Craufurd, Blair and Morris families.(Map reference: NS 2662 4893)
- Glen Mount, West Kilbride.
- Green Hill, Largs. Known at one time as Moot Hill because it may have been used as a court or law area moot by local lairds during the Medieval times.

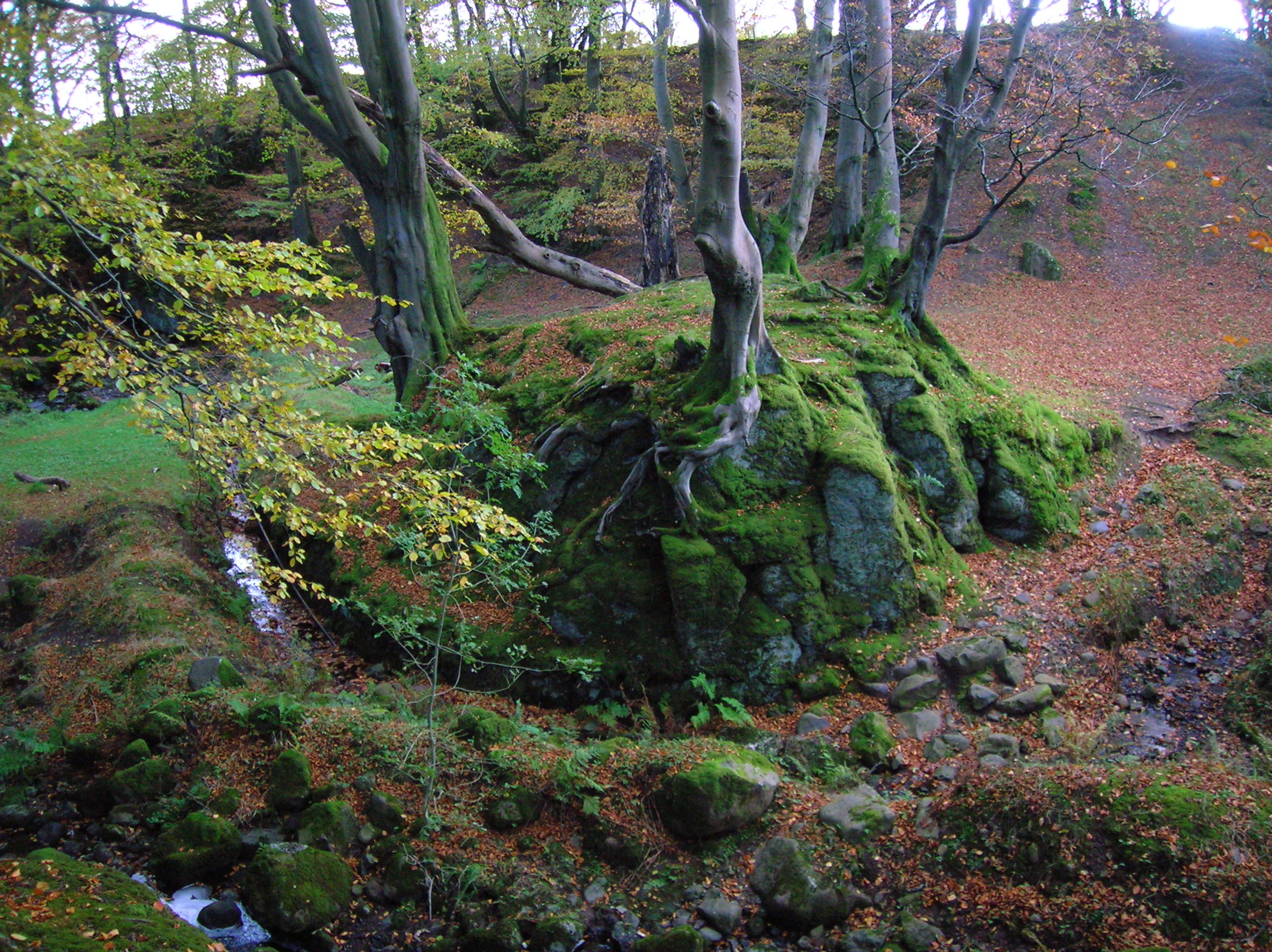
A likely semi-natural moot hill in the Giffordland Glen

- Green hill, Barony of Giffen, Barrmill. The moot hill stood near to Greenhill farm. This artificial mound was the site where proclamations of the Giffen Castle Baronial Court's judgements were made. No sign of the Moot hill seems to survive, however a bridge near to Greenhill is marked as 'Tappethillock', meaning a flat-topped hillock, which may refer to it.55.723887°N 4.589461°W
- Hutt Knowe or Hut Knol (NS 375 441), Bonshaw, Barony of Bollingshaw. 'Huit' in Scots is a heap or stack. It also known as Bonshaw or Bollingshaw Mound, 17 m (56 ft) in diameter and 2.7 m (8.9 ft) high, variously described as a mounded corn-kiln or lime kiln. Corn-drying kilns were often built into sloping ground or existing mounds. It is said to have large integral basal stones and was described in 1890 as having culverts or 'penns' in its sides, although these are not visible today. This mound has been excavated on several occasions without enough evidence being uncovered to determine its purpose. It lies close to the Glazert; Stacklawhill is nearby. A limekiln and a rarely mentioned ice house are also present on the site and this seems to have resulted in some confusion arising over the description of Hutt Knowe. Satellite imagery clearly shows that the mound stands on a raised irregularly shaped platform.55.3949°N 4.333°W
- Irvine Moor had a possible moot hill with a gallows hill nearby. It was 20 paces in diameter, 2 feet 6 inches (0.76 m) high on one side and 13 feet 8 inches (4.17 m) on the other. Gallows muir is one name given to the site on the older maps of the area.
- Knockrivoch (NS 253 451), Saltcoats.
- Law, Auchenmade. This moot hill lay half a mile to the east of Pencote Hill, near Auchenmade & had been ploughed out by 1895.
- Law hill – Symington. Barony of Symington. This moot lay at the bottom of the village and was completely levelled as part of improvements, by a Mr. Boyd in around 1860. Iron arrowheads and combs of horn were found during the demolition.
- Law Mound, twelve paces in diameter, at Threepwood near Barcraigs Reservoir.
- Lawthorn Mount (NS 346 407), Perceton. Lawthorn was also a cairn or barrow. It is 21 paces in diameter at the base, and 14 feet (4 m) in diameter on the top, the height being 9 feet 8 inches (2.95 m) It is said by oral tradition to have been a Justice hill. Stanecastle castle is nearby.
- Mound Wood near Kennox House and moss. An oval mound with drystone walling around it. Gallowayford is situated nearby on the Glazert Water. 55.4037°N 4.3450°W
- Mount (NS 202 585), Largs. Situated near the old church of Largs. Said by some to be the moot hill for Largs, but others see it as a burial mound for Norwegians (Norse).
- Stacklawhill near Bonshaw. Barony of Bollingshaw. Stewarton. A moot or gallows hill-like wooded mound (Dule Tree) set on high ground above the Hutt Knowe mound at Bonshaw. Hutt means heap or stack, so this may be the gallow hill of the stack law, i.e. Hutt Knowe Moot. The Glazert Water runs nearby. 55.3931°N 4.3520°W

==== Ayrshire (South) ====
- Law Hill – The Fullartons of Fullarton house, Troon, dispensed justice at the Law Hill which was close to their mansion. Farming activity reduced the moot hill and almost levelled it, so that a Pillar was erected there to mark the spot. This pillar was later removed and rebuilt with embellishments at the back gate of Monklands on the Isle O'Pins Road.
- Barons Stone – Parish of Girvan. At Killochan Castle this stone, an erratic, once formed part of a cliff, 2,000 feet (610 m) over its present site, far away among the hills of Loch Doon. In historical times, it formed the "Hill of Justice" of the barons of Killochan, where they mustered their men, planned their raids, shared their booty, and hanged troublesome prisoners.
- Court Knowe, Ballantrae. (NX 121 836 55.1111°N 4.9474°W)
- Hall of Auchincross or Court Hill (NS 5834 1407). Parish: New Cumnock. A court knowe near the Hall of Auchincross, on which criminals are said to have been tried by the laird of Auchincross. A low, rounded knoll, roughly 30 by 20 m (98 by 66 ft), under pasture. The farmer at Hall of Auchincross stated that its profile was once sharper but that it has been reduced in recent years through land improvement. 55.4001°N 4.2385°W
- Hill of Justice (NX 185 980), see Knockushion, Girvan.55.2427°N 4.8565°W
  The Hutt Knowe as drawn by Smith in 1895
- Knockushion (NX 1850 9807). Also 'Knockcushan', this Knoll or Hill of Justice in Girvan was a Law or Court Hill. The existence of the mound is now marked by a modern pillar bearing the following inscription:-"Knockushion" (Hill of Justice) – From time immemorial the seat of the head – courts of the ancient jurisdiction of Carrick. King Robert the Bruce, Earl of Carrick, held court here and granted charter to the Friars of Ayre". The rest of the inscription is weathered away. No mound is visible at the site. 55.2433°N 4.8565°W Girvan Steeple's name comes from the Gaelic "Olladh Stiom Paidh" and relates to the phrase "Great Circle of Justice" which is a similar meaning to Knockcushan Street, upon which the tower sits.
- Lawhill. Parish of Cumnock. In the seventeenth century, a piece of land in the Skerrington property was in at least one instance called Lawhill, though the same piece of land was elsewhere called Lonehill, Clocklounie, Clochlouie, and Clockloie.
- Moat of Alloway. The Magistrates of Ayr appear from the records of the town to have frequently held Courts of Justice for the trial of petty cases, according to their charter, on its summit.
- Mootehill. Parish of Cumnock. A half-merkland of the two merklands of Horsecleuch in the parish of Cumnock (now Old Cumnock) was as late as the seventeenth century named Mootehill, earlier Mwthill.
- Mote-hill. Helenton, near Symington. Barony of Helenton. Some ruins were present on its summit.
- Tarbolton Mote, Hoodshill or Torbol (NS 4323 2734). Parish of Tarbolton. A fairly substantial mound on a natural prominence on the outskirts of the village. It is classified as a motte and bailey. The artificial mound is 10 feet (3 m) high, 25 yards (23 m) wide at the base and was the Court Hill of the Barony of Tarbolton. It was formerly called the Mote, but now is more frequently named Hoodshill, from a schoolmaster called Hood, whose pupils played on it. It is the only common attached to the village of Tarbolton, and a bonfire was lit on it annually on the night preceding the June Fair up until at least the 1860s. A Gallow Hill is situated nearby overlooking what was the old Coilsfield estate. Paterson records that the moot hill bonfire was built from fuel collected from every house and then placed on a circular altar or fireplace of turf. He states that Tarbolton translates as the town at the Hill where Baal was worshipped. The hall built on this mount was the chief messuage of the Barony, where seisin was invested.55.5146°N 4.4844°W

===== Some Ayrshire moot hills =====
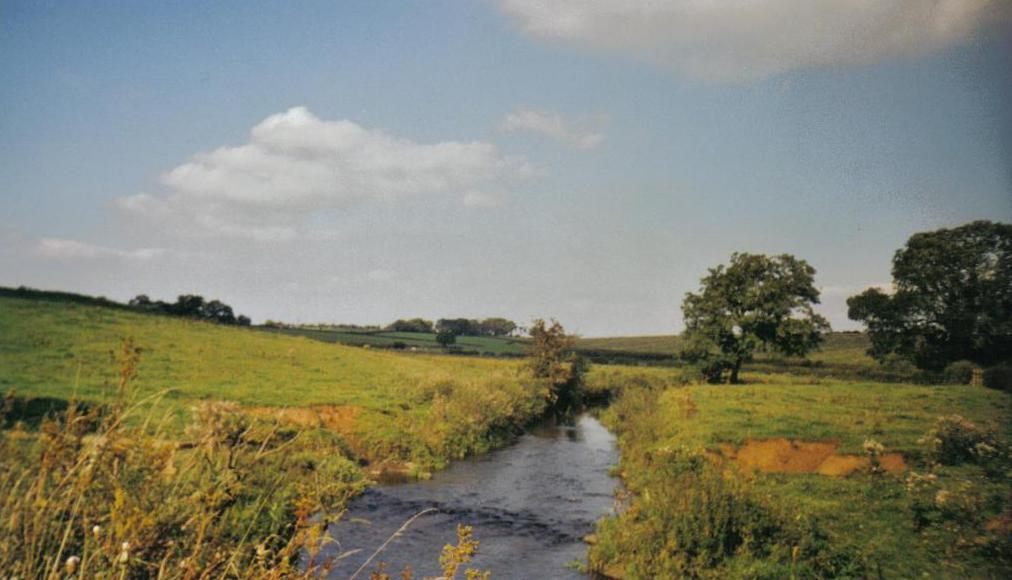
A view of the Glazert at Gallowayford.

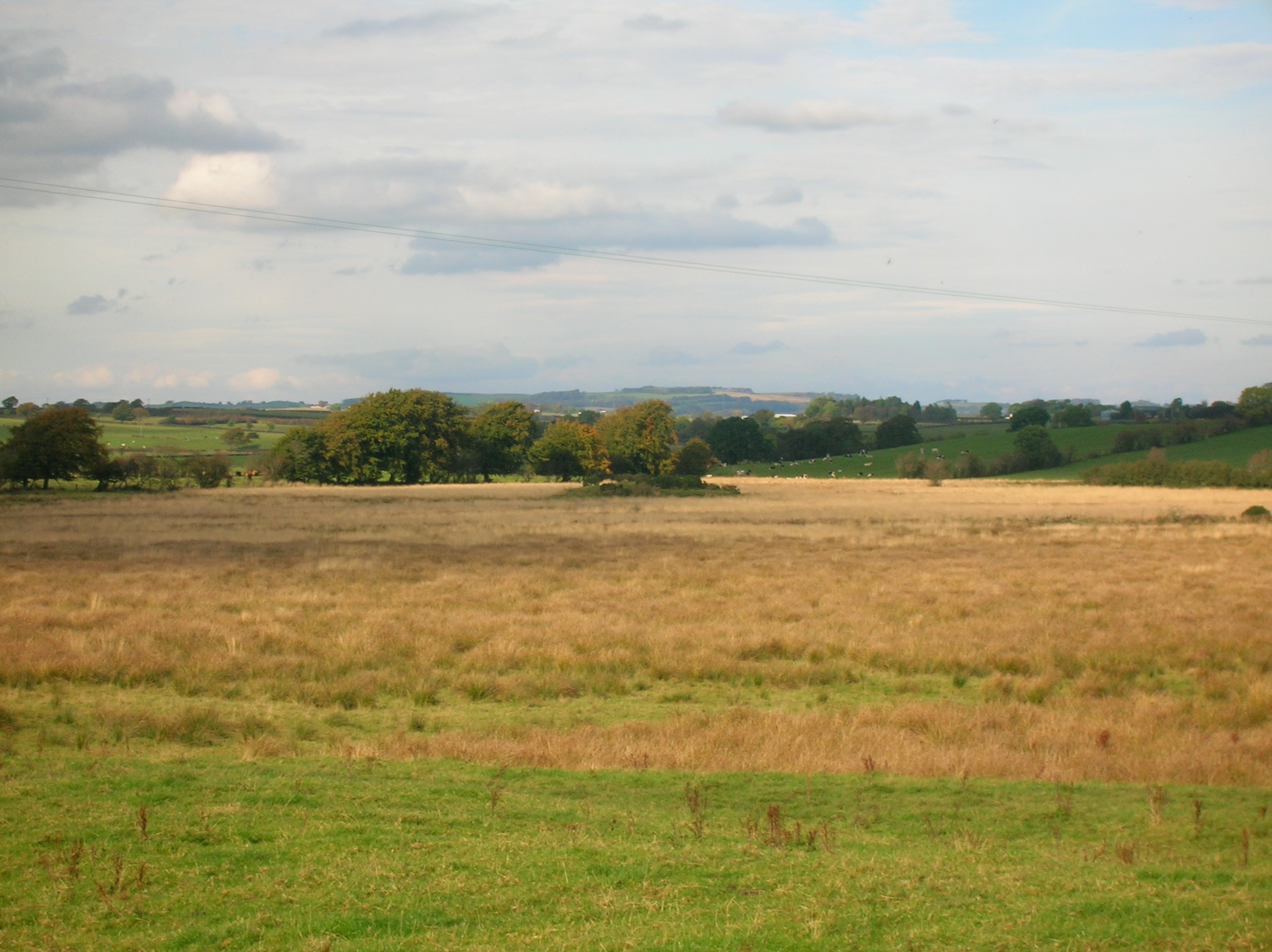
A distant view of the enigmatic Mound Wood on Kennox Moss in 2007.

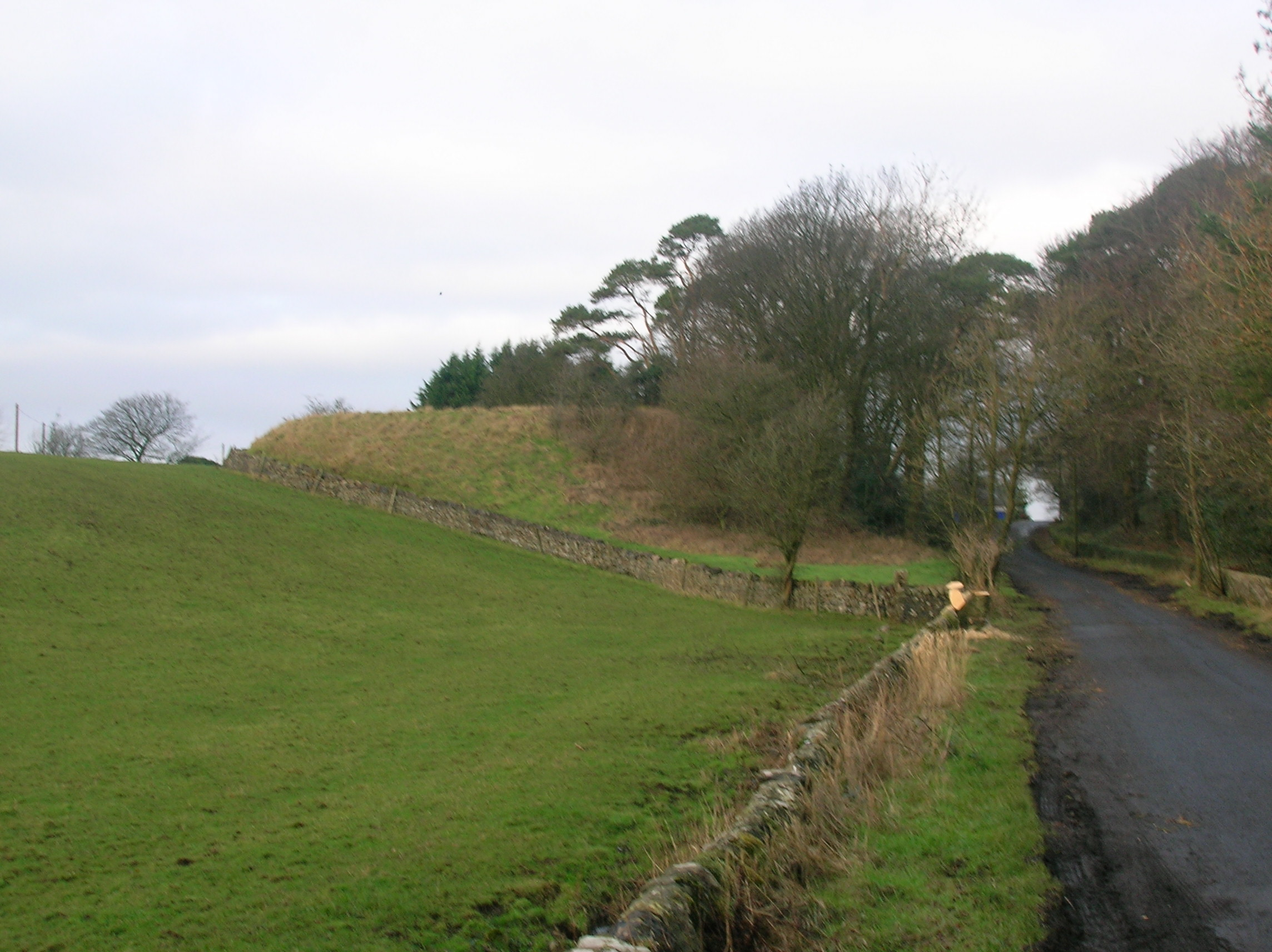
The Chapel Moot Hill from the Annick Water.

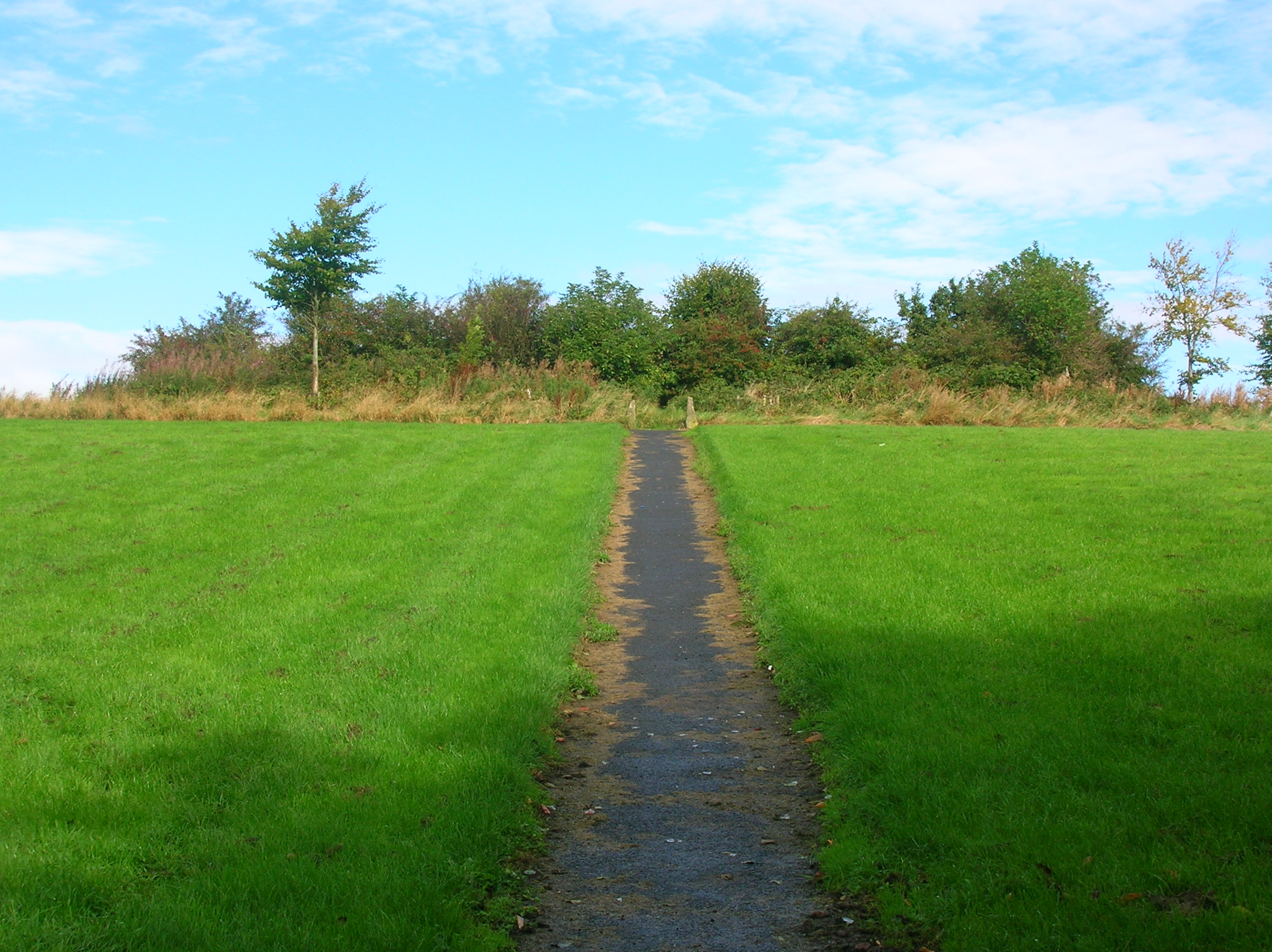
Lawthorn mount Justice Hill.

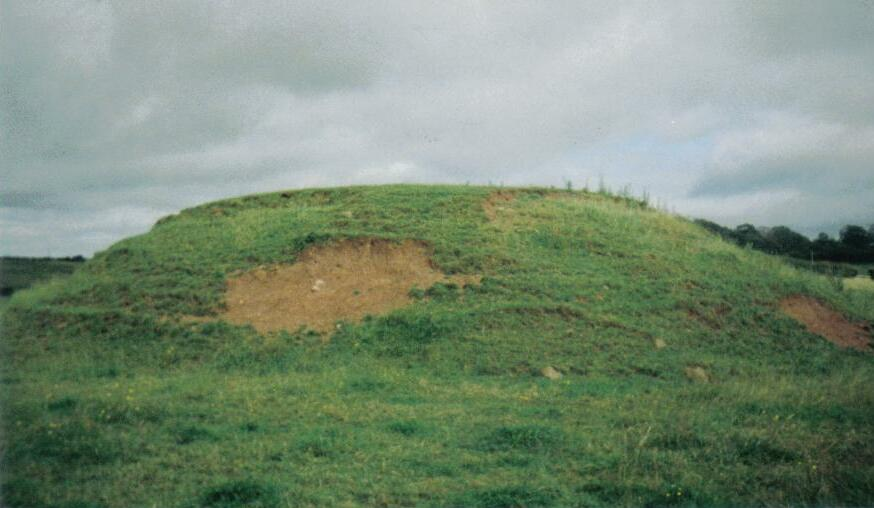
The Moot Hill or Law Mount above the River Annick near Castleton Farm.

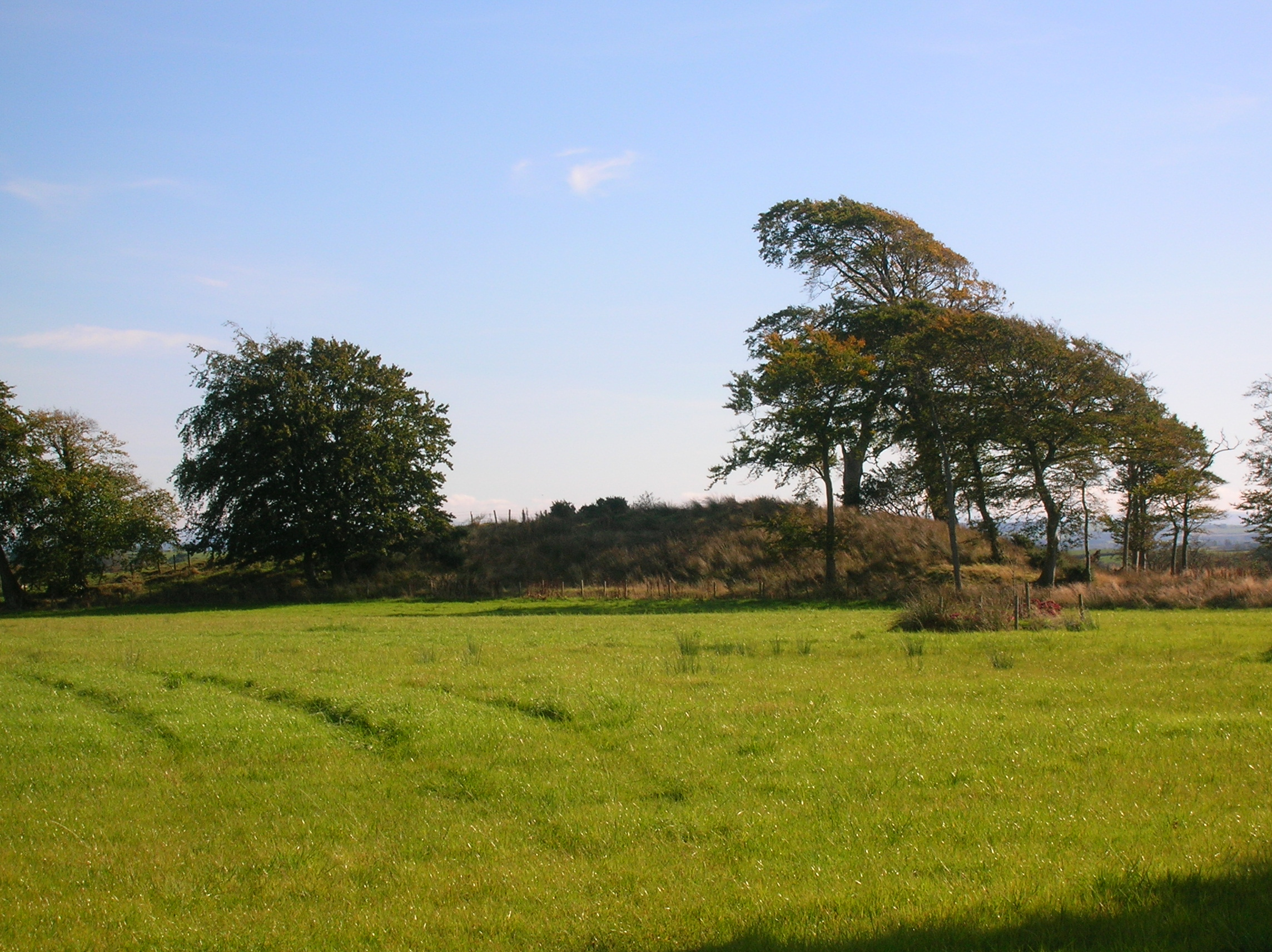
The possible moot or gallows hill at Stacklawhill.

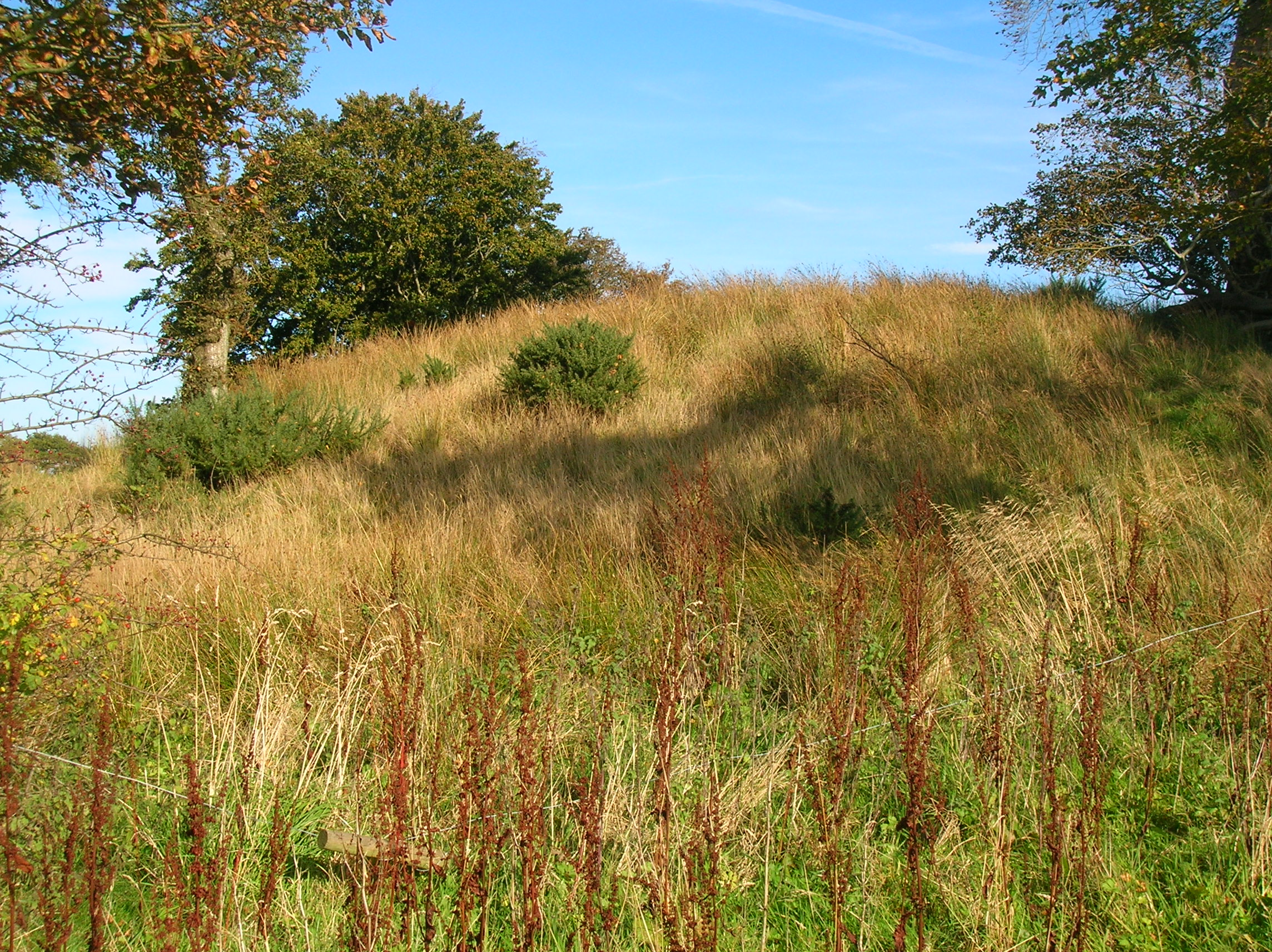
A close up view of Stacklawhill.
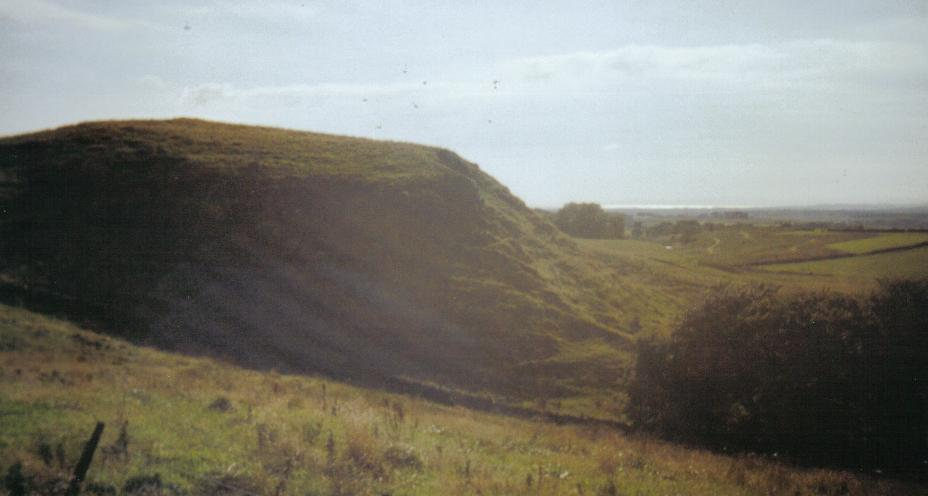
Craighead Law, possibly a Justice or Moot Hill.

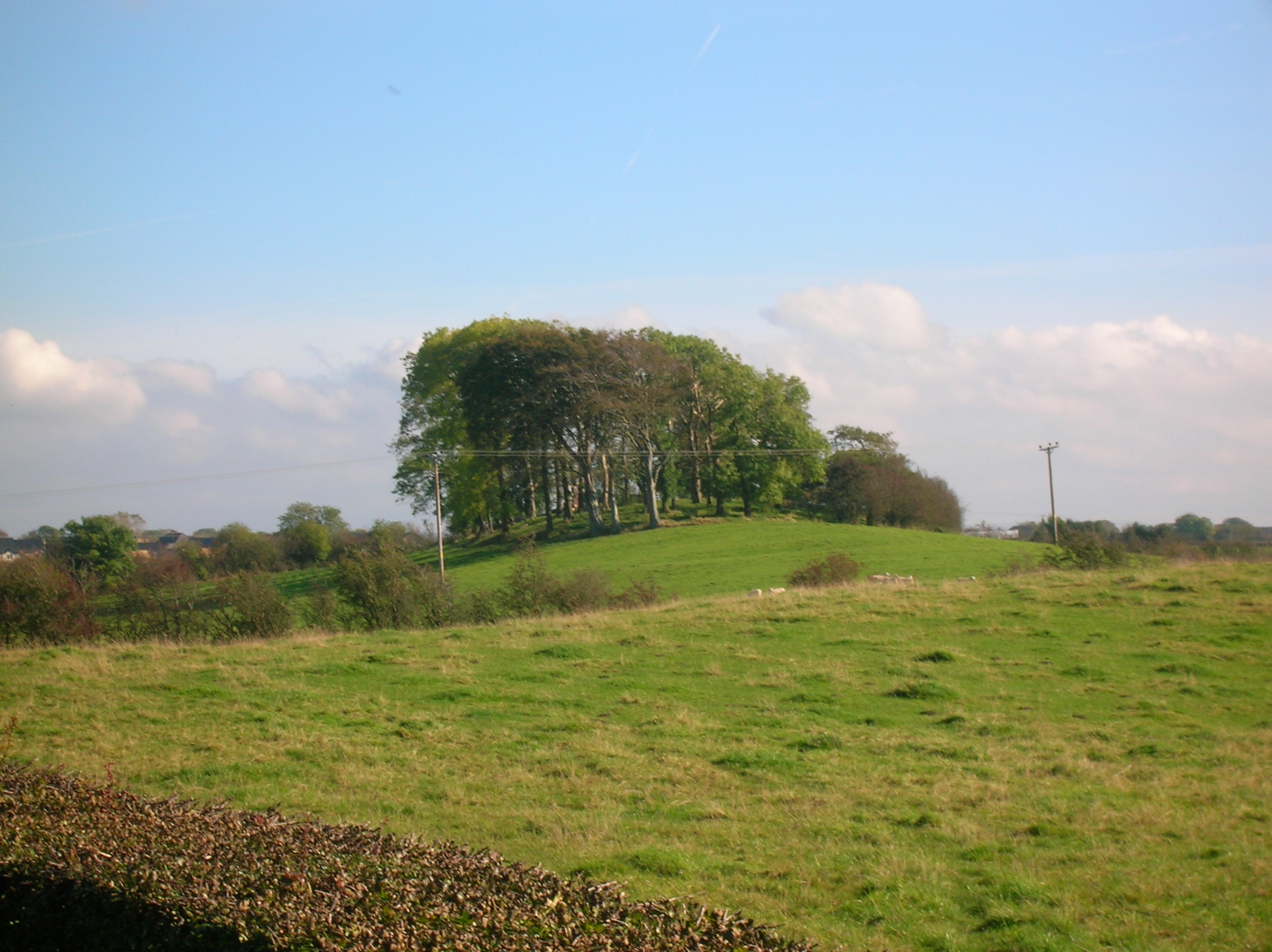
The Knockland Hill, locally referred to in Kilmaurs as 'Bowie's Munt.'

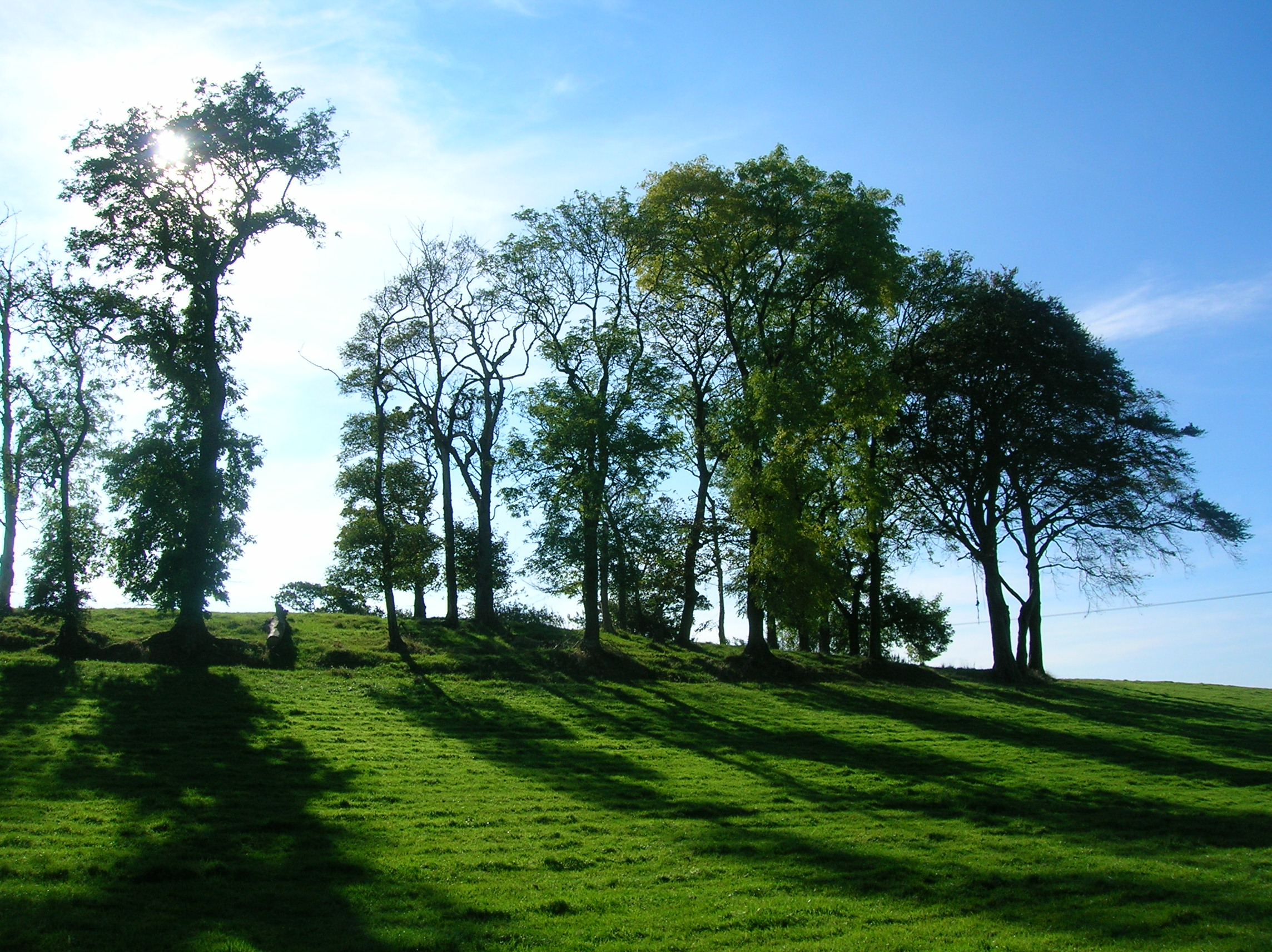
Bowie's munt from Knockland Hill road.

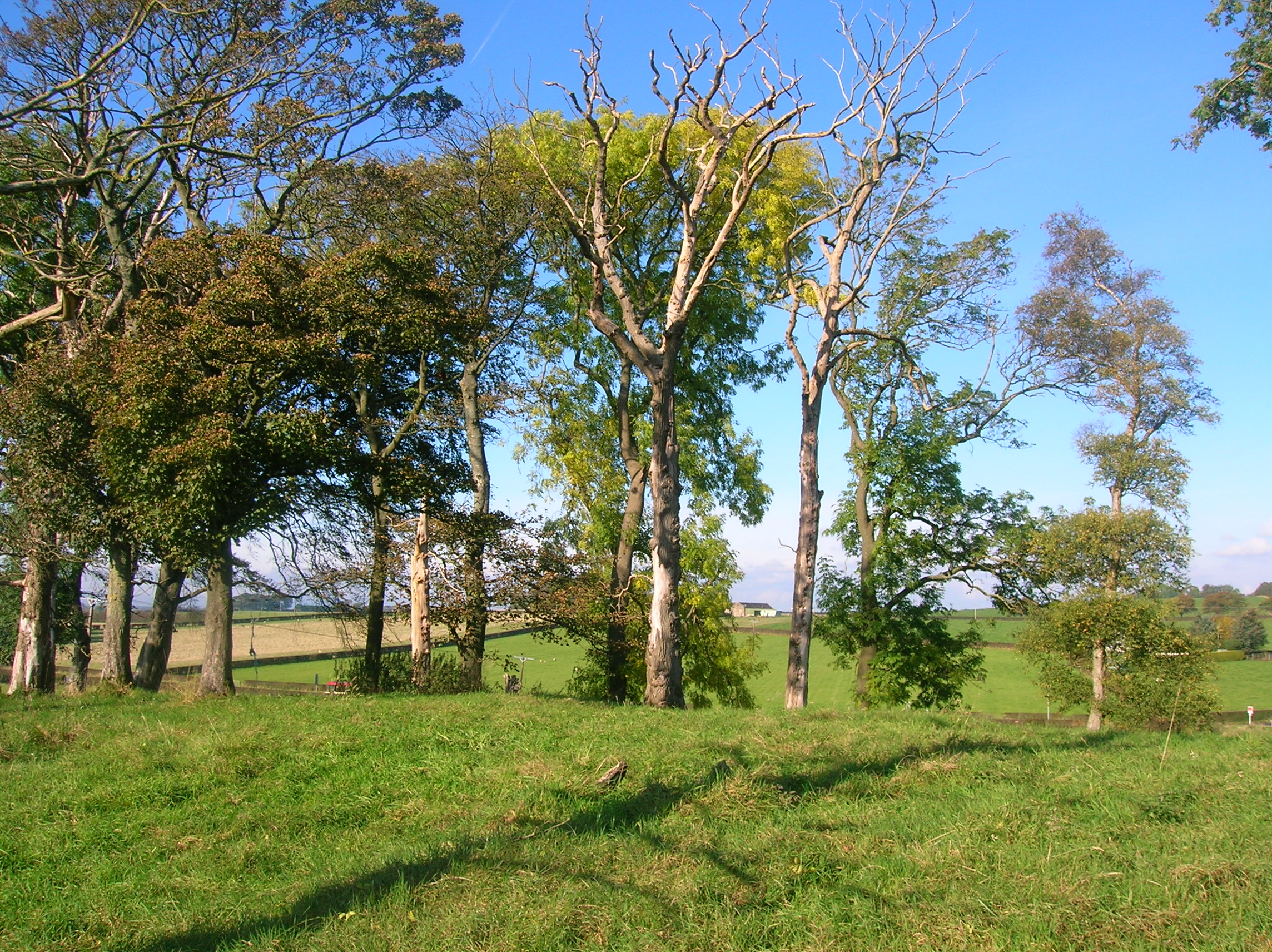
A view inside Bowie's munt.

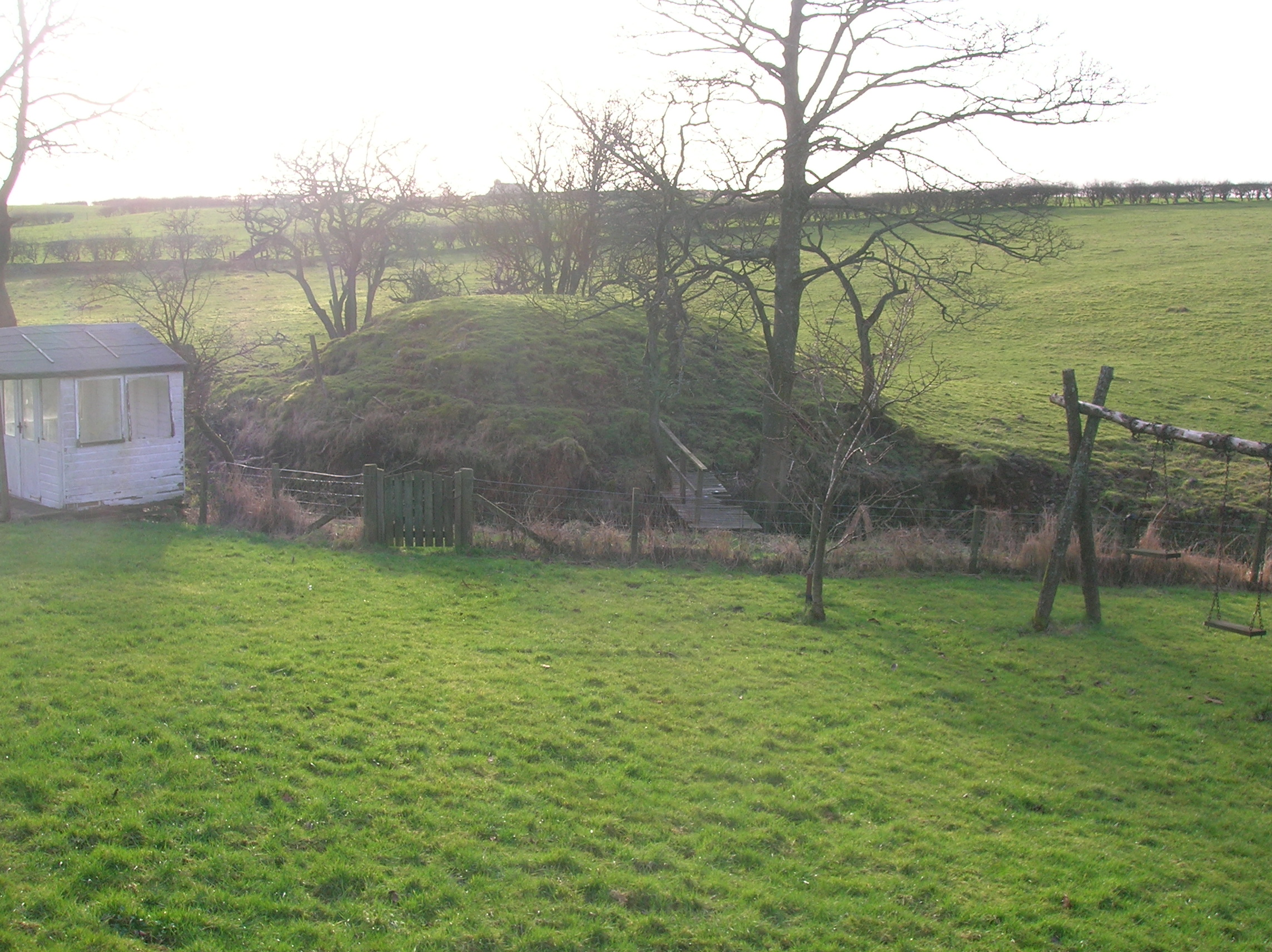
The Court Hill at Beith.

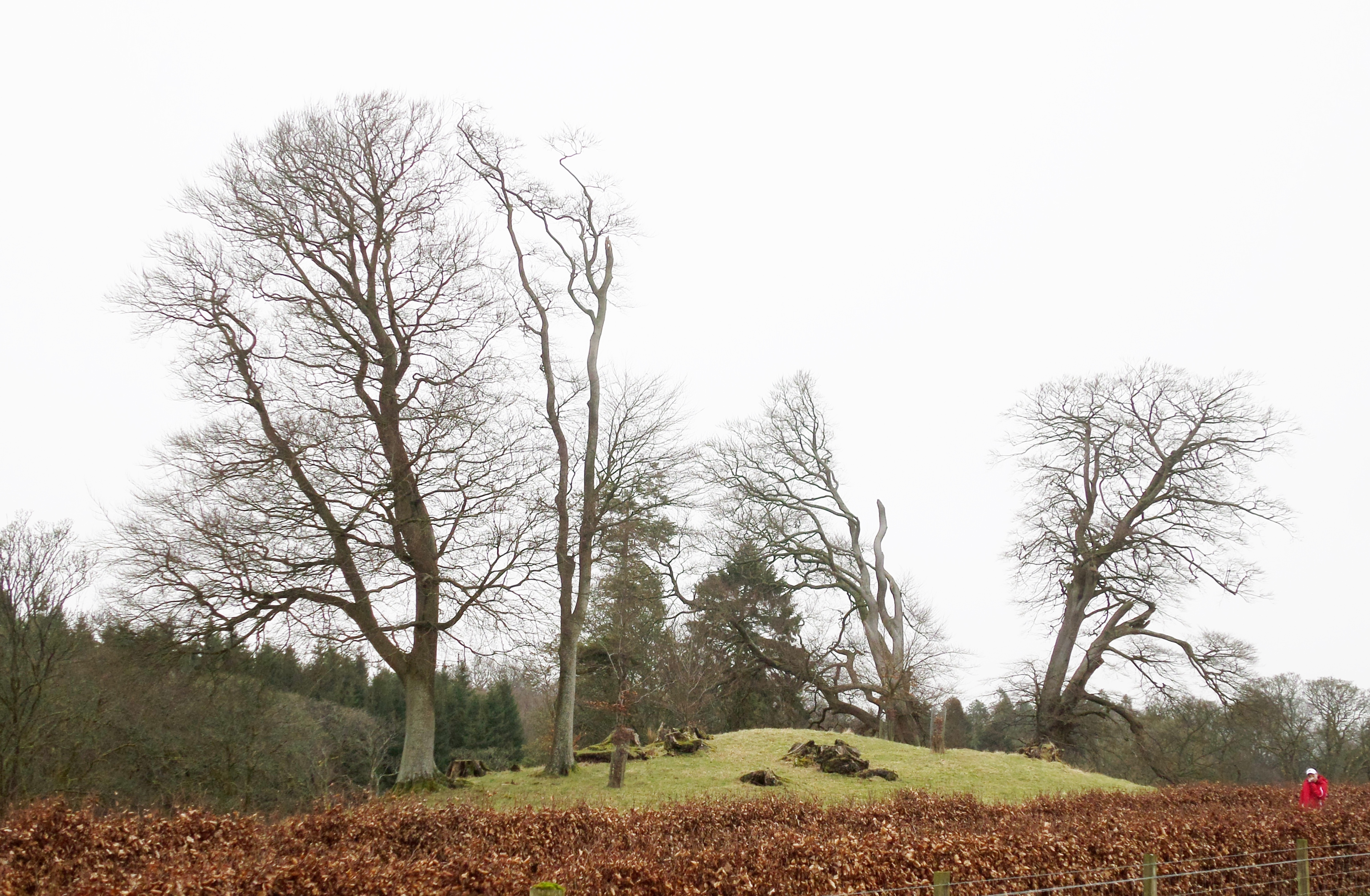
The Blair Court Hill.

==== Borders ====
- Court Hill is marked on the OS map, lying close to Dawyck House near Stobo village.

==== Carrick ====
Smith states that there were no moot hills in Carrick.

==== Dumfries and Galloway ====
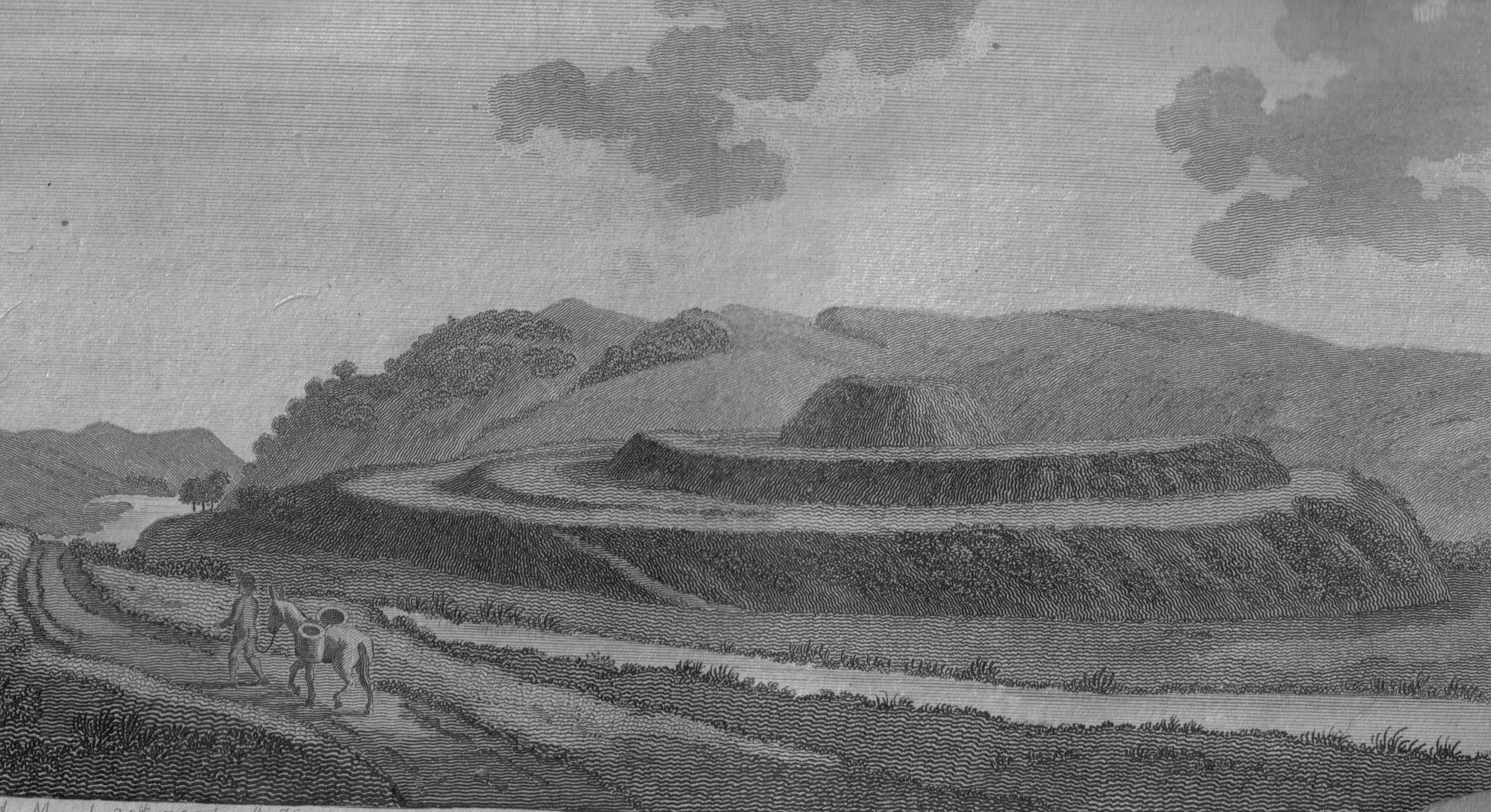
The Motte of Urr.

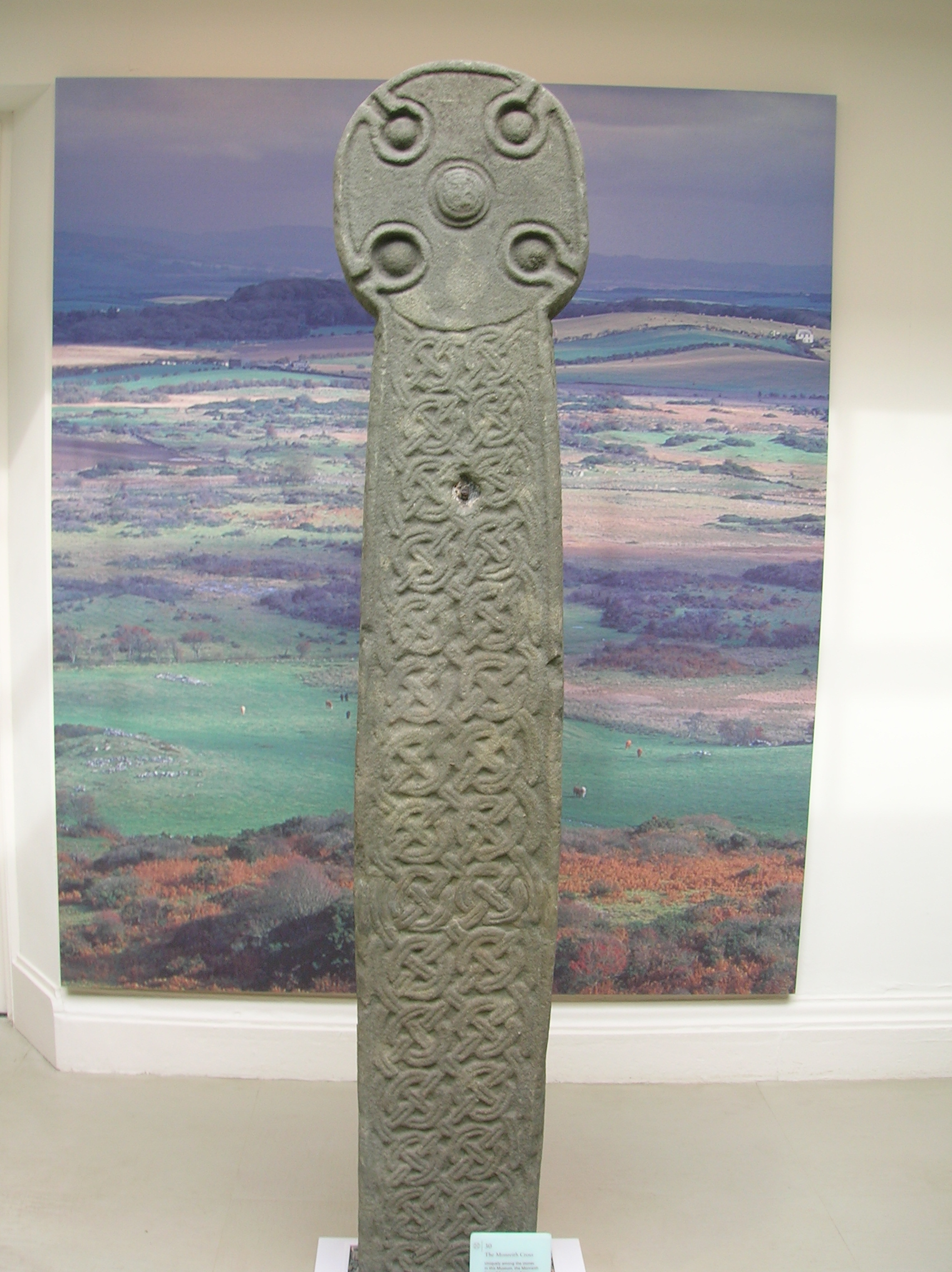
The Monreith Cross with signs of the attachment of the old judicial jougs (a metal punishment collar).

- Barnside Hill was the place of execution for the regality and barony of Lag in Nithsdale. Sir Robert Grierson, as stated, was the last laird to try, condemn and execute a person in Nithsdale, circa 1697.
- Court Hill (NX 815 929). Parish of Tynron. A small hill where the Courts of the barony of Aird were held.55.2161°N 3.8641°W
- Court Hill (NX 3765 4275). Parish of Glasserton. A considerable hill on the farm of Fell near Mochrum, the site of the laird's dwelling before the Maxwells built Monreith House. Mr Cumming says that it has been handed down by tradition that a court of justice had been held here in ancient times by the Druids hence its name.54.7534°N 4.5242°W The Monreith Cross used to stand upon it until it was removed to Monreith House and finally to the Whithorn Museum.
- Motte of Urr. The great judicial centre of the Kings of Galloway, covering the lands below the waters of the River Cree.
- Tinwald (NY 0030 8151) – alternative Names: Tynwald; Motte of Tinwald; Tinwald Motte; Tinwald Mote. A bailey or motte.55.1179°N 3.5647°W

==== East Dunbartonshire ====
- Mugdock Moot Hill – Prior to the early 18th century, the Moot Hill was an island on Mugdock Loch. The loch was drained between 1710 and 1714 to claim land and construct avenues for the newly developing Craigend Estate. Gallowhill is nearby. Before 1747 prisoners of Mugdock Castle's barony jail were rowed out to Moot Island for the trial, en route to the gallows at Gallowhill if they were convicted. Gallowhill is located close to the Visitor Centre. In the SW trench the rock fell away quickly into deep peat deposits. A drystone revetment ran alongside the edge of the mound, which had been interpreted as a landing place or quay. Excavation and survey revealed that this was a stock-proof dyke, probably of 19th-century date. The island was renamed Moot Hill when the loch was drained and became a feature for residents and visitors to Craigend House as it was, and still is, situated close to the main avenue. Excavation work at Moot Hill carried out by Glasgow University in 2003 confirmed that Moot Hill is made of solid rock and has deposits of dark coloured peat covering it.

==== Fife ====
- Moat Hill – Cupar. The Burgh Survey states that, through the years, it has been known as Moot Hill, Mote Hill, Cam Hill and Mons Placiti. Sibbald noted in the 18th century that the word cam in Gaelic meant crooked and was very descriptive of the long, winding ridge of which Castle Hill formed a part. The Reporter in the Statistical Account of the Burgh suggested that it should have been styled Mote Hill as it was probably the place where the Justiciar of Fife had his courts and published his enactments.
- Dalginch, Markinch. A mound at Northhall, Markinch is now believed to be the site of Dalginch mentioned in the Regiam Majestatem as the capital place of Fife where judgements were enacted. It was once a mound in the crook of the Markinch Burn and is now a cemetery. The name was transferred to the wider barony and subsequently to a 19th-century farmhouse about a kilometre to the east. The judicial function of the location appears to have been assumed by Cupar during the 13th century.

==== Glasgow ====
- Doomster Hill – Parish of Govan NS 554 658, a large earthen mound with a stepped profile and level summit. It stood near the river Clyde, north of the present Govan Cross. It was removed in the early 19th-century and Reid's Dyeworks erected on the site. In 1996, a team from Channel 4's Time Team programme carried out a dig at the site. They suggested that it could be a 12th-century Norman motte. The 'Doom' was the name given to the reading of the sentence of the court by the Deemster of the Baronial court. 55.8636°N 4.3121°W

==== Highland ====
- Court Hill (NH 7356 5762), Rosemarkie. An apparently artificial mound of nearly a circular form, and level on the top. It is probably where the manor courts were held. 57.5908°N 4.1168°W
- Courthill, Kishorn. A supposed moot-hill lies north of the burial-ground and chapel of Saint Donnan.
- Moot Hill, Dingwall. The "D" of Dingwall is the Norse rune which represents the sound of "th", Dingwall being "thingvollr", the place of assembly of the Norse "thing" court. That court met on an earthen mound on a site which today is the Cromartie Car Park, adjacent to St Clement's kirkyard and the historic parish church of Dingwall.57.6077°N 4.42793°W

==== Inverclyde ====
- Moot hill, Kilmacolm, near the River Gryffe.

==== Moray ====
- Court Hillock (NJ 3815 6300), Upper Auchenreath. a cairn. Traditionally said to have been a hill of justice 57.6526°N 3.0380°W.

==== Perth and Kinross ====
- Court Hill (NO ), Parish of Auchtergaven. An earthen mound 40 ft (12 m) high, evidently artificial and traditionally the site of judicial courts held prior to 1745.56.4801°N 3.4997°W
- Gallow's Hill above Milling Farm on the western shore of the Lake of Menteith. This bold knoll is supposed to have been the site of execution of the Earls of Menteith. The last execution is said to have been of a young man; an unjust accusation having been levelled against him by the Earl of having stolen a horse.56°10′N 4°17′W
- Loak Court Hill (NO ). Parish of Auchergaven. A Barrow. An earthen mound 40 ft (12 m) high, evidently artificial and traditionally the site of judicial courts held prior to 1745.56.4801°N 3.4997°W
- Lonforgan or Hund Hill – Sir Patrick Gray as lord of the Barony of Longforgan held a baronial court here in 1385. The officials present were the same as those of the sovereign's courts.
- Moot Hill, Struan. The assembly mound measures approx. 20-foot (6.1 m) high and is approx. 75 ft (23 m) in diameter across the base and 55 ft (17 m) across the top. It is generally held to be an early stronghold of the Chiefs of Clan Donnachaidh. A number of factors that suggest that it may be a moot.
- Mote-hill or Torran Mhoid in Scottish Gaelic. Balliemore, near Castle Roy. The title of Laird of Abernethy went with the possession of the moot hill and a story is told of one Earl of Moray who feued out all the other lands of Abernethy, but would not part with the moot hill, even if the top was covered with golden guineas. Another story tells of a Baron Baillie of Balliemore who took earth from the local churchyard and spread it onto his fields. He was persuaded to stop but later died from apoplexy while on the moot hill, because although he had stopped stealing the earth, he was still stealing it in his heart and God had punished him accordingly. There was a drowning pool here where witches and female criminals were drowned.
- Prior's Meadow Mound at Port of Menteith. This small earth mound is supposed to have been formed from consecrated earth brought over from Ireland. This tradition may be linked to Colmaig, the old Irish saint and bishop who gave his name to Inchmahome island. This may have been the 'Hill of Justice' of the abbot who possessed baronial feudal rights.56°10′N 4°17′W
- Scone Moot Hill. The mons placiti or Scone mote hill is the inauguration site of the Scottish Kings. It is also called 'Boot Hill', possibly from an ancient tradition whereby emissaries swore fealty to their king by wearing the earth of their own lands in their foot-bindings or boots.

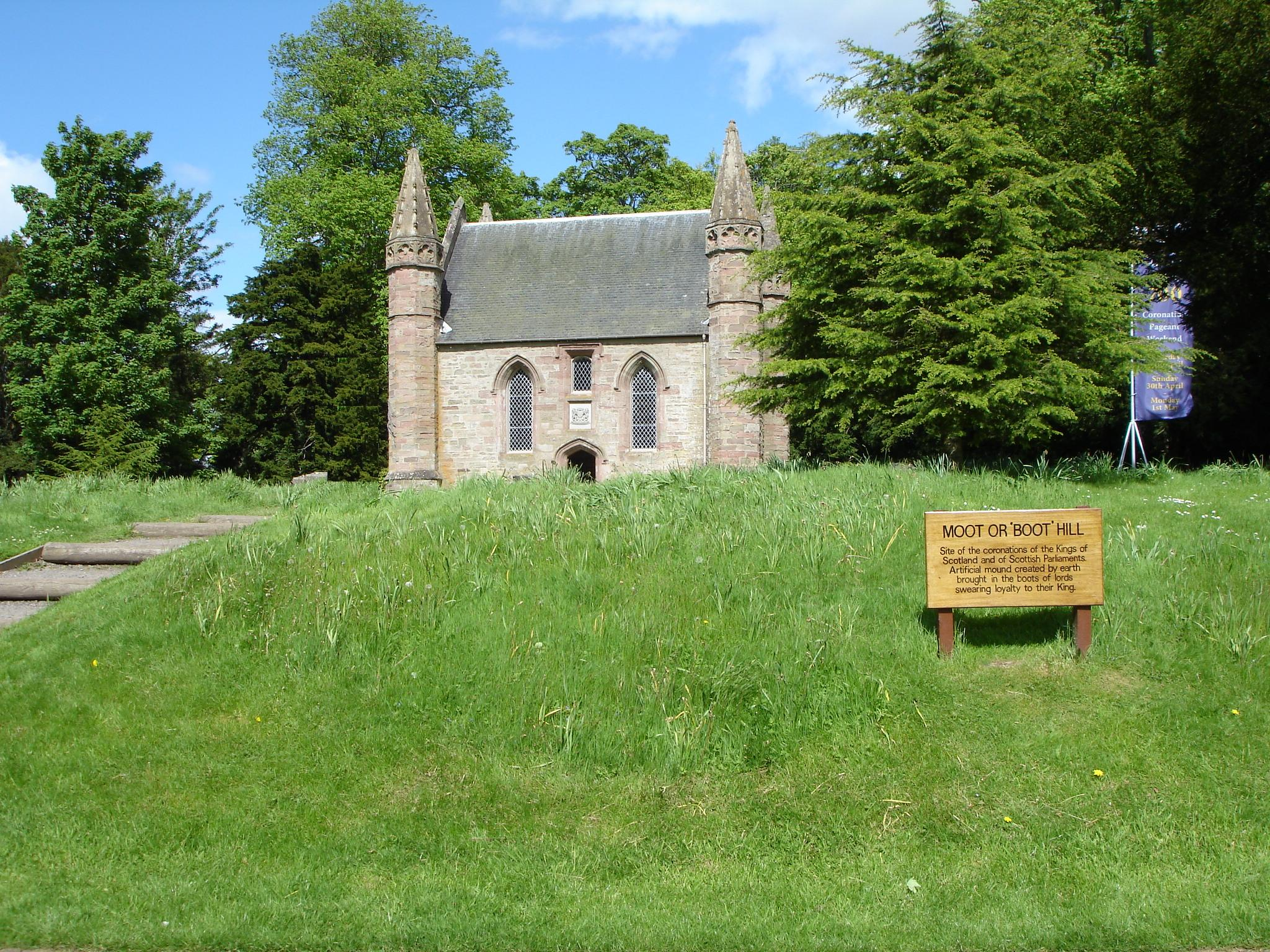
The Scone "Moot hill" and its chapel today.

==== East Renfrewshire ====
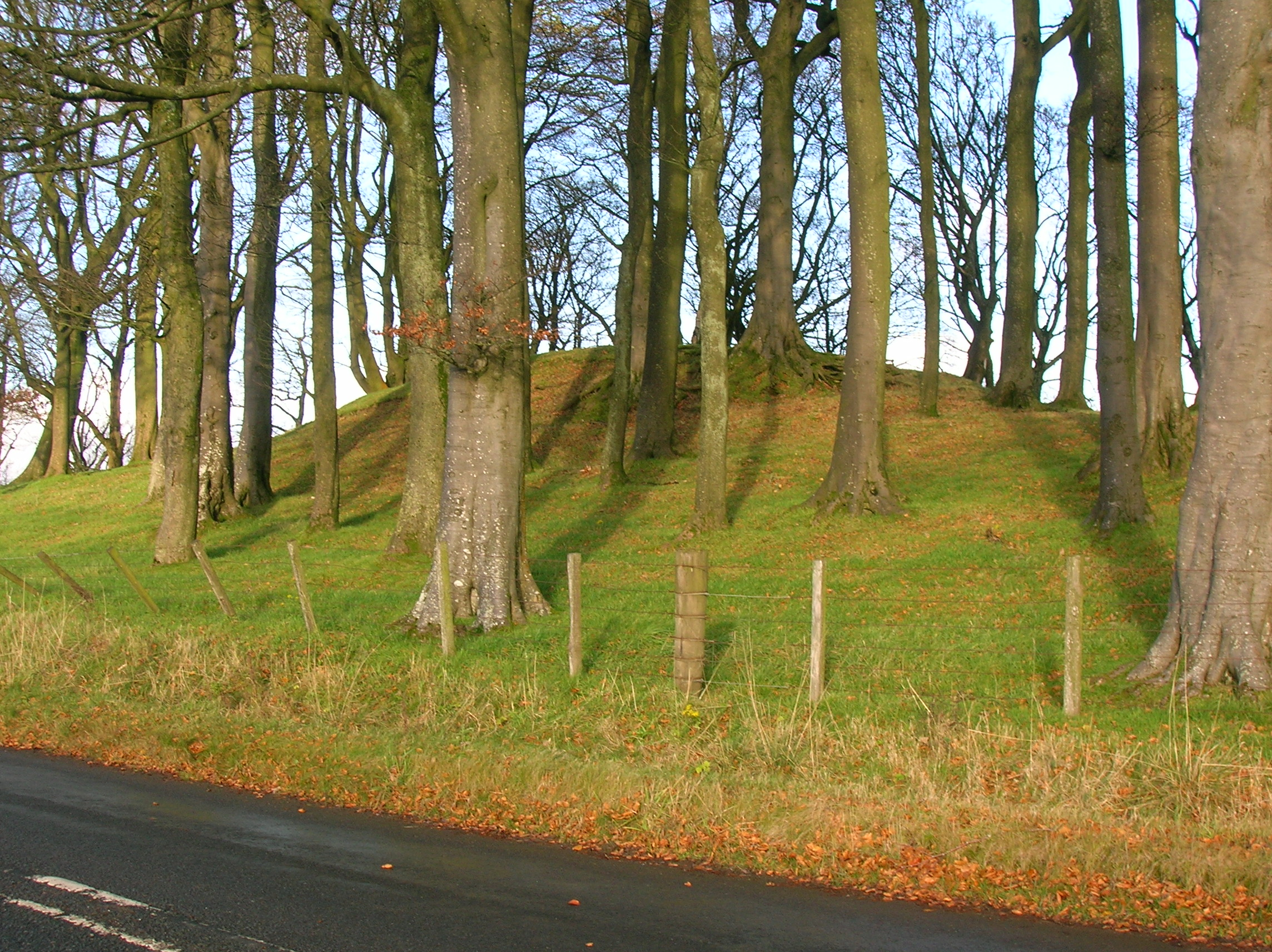
Castle Hill at Eaglesham

- Castle Hill, Eaglesham. Also known as the 'Deil's Planting'. A candidate to be the Moot Hill of the Barony of Eaglesham; a Gallowshill is located nearby. The Montgomerie family built Polnoon Castle and held the barony for several hundred years.

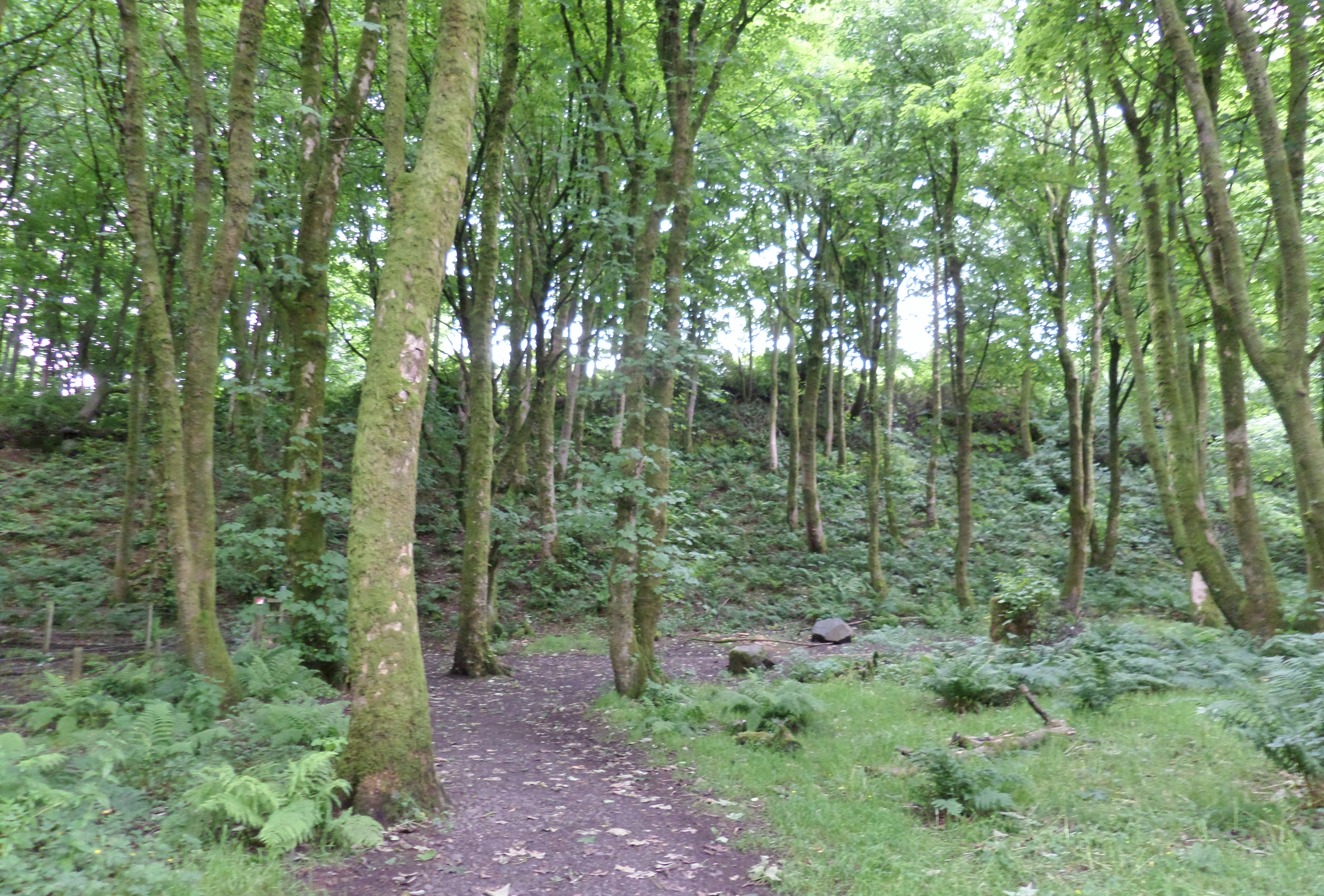
Courtshaw Wood and hill.

==== Renfrewshire ====
- Courtshaw Hill – near the site of the old Castle Semple mansion in the Clyde Muirshiel Regional Park.

==== Ross and Cromarty ====
- Hill of Strife, Ullinish, Isle of Skye. Samuel Johnson was informed that this hill near Ulinish House was where justice used to be administered.

==== Stirling ====
- Court Hill, Duntreath, Strathblane. What used to be known as "the Court Hill", now Park Hill, rises on the east side of the Blane Valley. The top has been levelled, possibly for a fort, or a "mons placiti" or Moot Hill where courts of justice were held. The feudal privileges attached to Duntreath, indicate its importance.

=== England ===
==== Buckinghamshire ====
- Secklow Mound in Milton Keynes (SP 851 391 52.0437°N 0.7606°W).

==== Cumbria ====
- Carlisle Moothill. Patrick Fraser Tytler's History of Scotland, iv. 413, records that Lord Wharton, after his repulse in a raid up Nithsdale in 1547 held a Court at the Moothill beside Carlisle, and condemned ten of the Scottish "pledges" to be hanged.

==== Northumberland ====
- Gallows Knowe, Berwick-upon-Tweed (NT 9938 5351 55.7749°N 2.01145°W).

==== Nottinghamshire ====
- Spellow Hill, Radcliffe on Trent (SK 6656 4014 52.9545°N 1.0107°W).

==== Wiltshire ====
- Downton Moot is no longer considered to be a moot hill. The earthworks in Downton Moot Garden are the remains of a 12th-century motte-and-bailey castle.
- Merlin's Mount. In the grounds of Marlborough College. 51.416125°N 1.738239°W
- Swanborough Tump, meeting place of Swanborough Hundred.

==== Yorkshire ====
- Moat Hill Birstall
- Rise, Yorkshire (TA 1460 4170 53.8589°N 0.2590°W).

=== Isle of Man ===
- Tynwald, St John's 54.2037°N 4.6423°W. This stepped structure is probably of great antiquity and is nowadays thought originally to have been a burial mound of the Bronze Age. It is said to be formed of earth brought from each of the seventeen parishes of the Isle of Man.

== See also ==
- Fief
- Legal history
