= Castle Knowe, Kilruskin =

Mound in North Ayrshire, Scotland

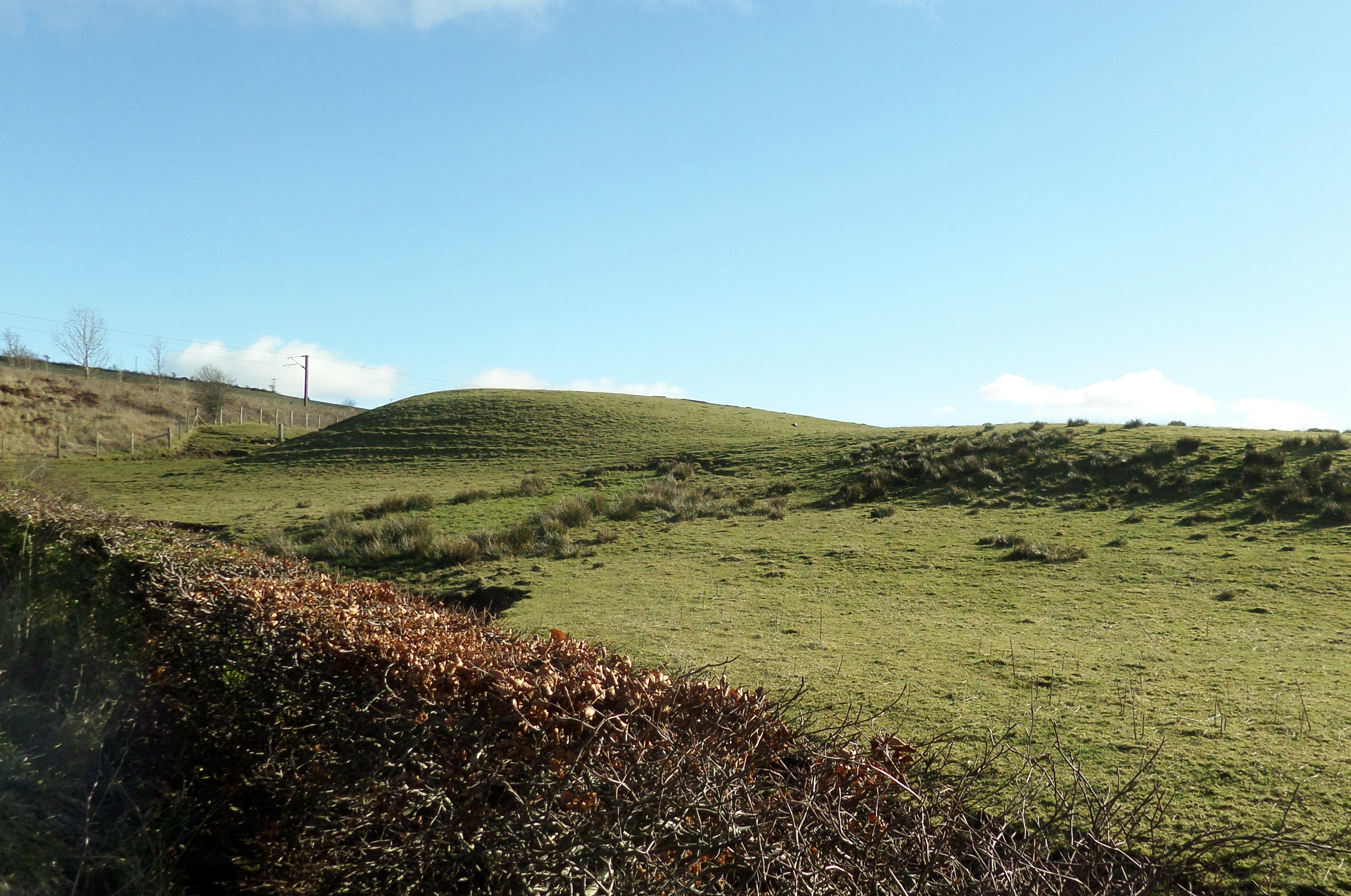

- Location within Scotland
- 55.7175°N 4.8613°W
- Type: Tumulus / Motte & Bailey
- Periods: Medieval
- Location: North Ayrshire, Scotland grid reference NS20365081

Site notes
- Archaeologists: John Smith
- Condition: Cultivation damage
- Owner: Private
- Public access: Yes
- Website: Historic Environment Scotland
- A Tumulus has also been suggested.

The Castle Knowe (NS20365081) is a prominent mound located slightly to the west of North Kilruskin Farm on the Kilruskin Toll Road, West Kilbride, North Ayrshire, Scotland. The mound may have served several different functions over the ages.

== History ==
The Castle Knowe has been referred to as a fortlet or castle hill and was classed as a motte and bailey in 1974 and records show that a stone rampart was removed in the 1890s for re-use elsewhere. A broad and deep foss or ditch existed that has been obscured as a feature following the Kilruskin Burn's diversion through a covered culvert. The long established road from the Ardrossan area to Fairlie, Largs and beyond runs very close to the Castle Knowe so that a fortified structure would be in a position to control movements along this communications corridor.

=== Etymology ===
The place-name elements 'Knowe' and 'Knol' are derived from the Old English 'Cnoll' meaning a small rounded hill, hillock or mound, sometimes associated with tales of the fairies.

The place-name 'Kilruskin' is said to have been 'Kilronskan' originally, derived from 'The Cell of Saint Ronskan'. A chapel at a place named Kirkstead to the unknown Saint Ronskan or Ruskin is said to have stood at the foot of the hills to the east of Kilruskin. It has also been suggested that Kilruskin may mean 'The Chapel of the Rushes' from the Gaelic 'riasg' in keeping with the very marshy conditions of the low-lying land lying between Kilruskin and Hunterston.

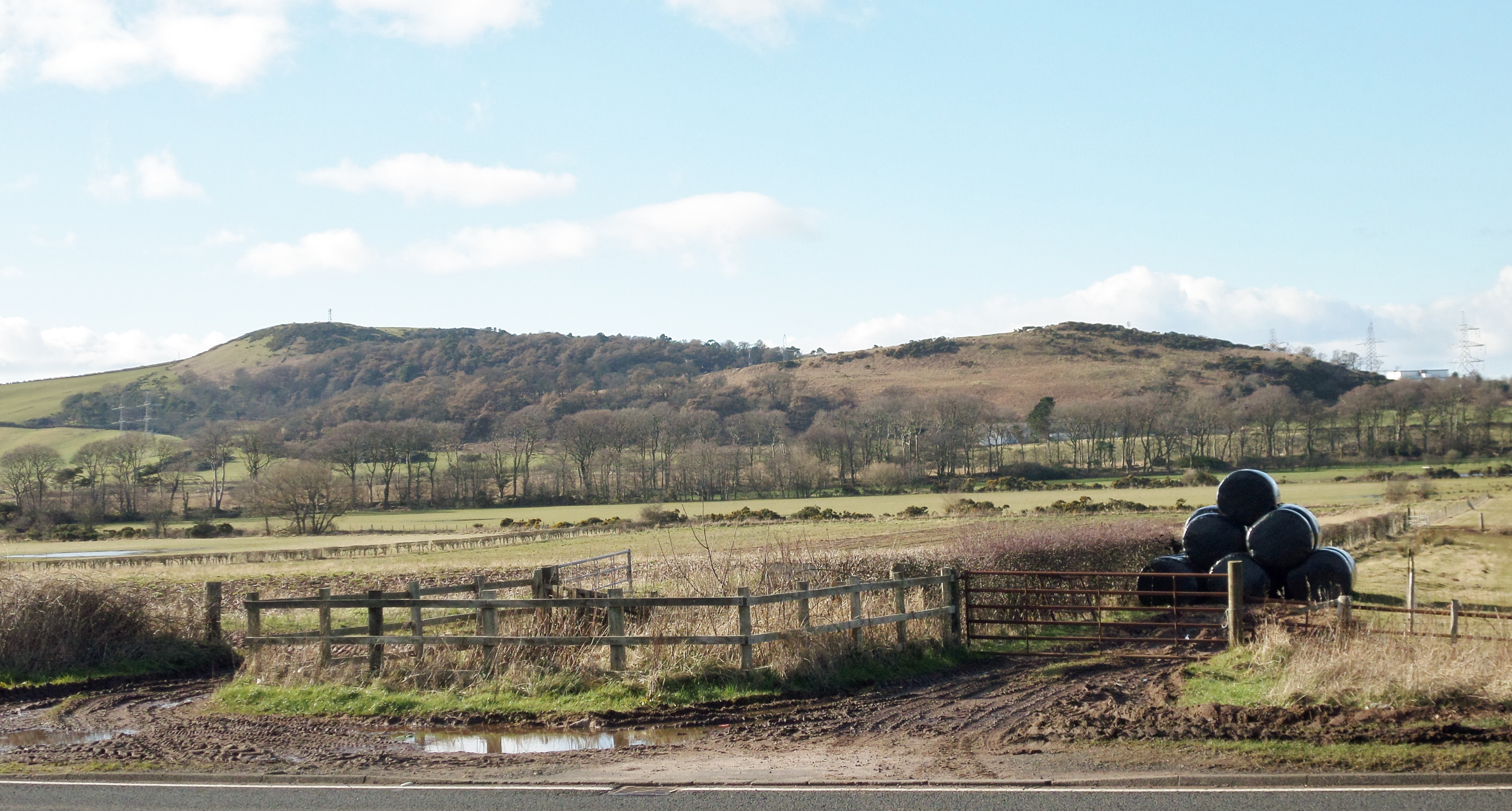
Goldenberry Hill from the Castle Knowe

=== Antiquarian visits ===
In 1895 the antiquarian John Smith recorded that the site had been subject to cultivation for many years but was still a prominent feature that measured at the time 37 paces in diameter at the bottom, circa 14 feet on one side and circa 8 feet on the other. Castle Knowe was considered artificial by early visitors and natural by later visiting experts although formal archaeological investigations have not taken place.

=== Moot hill ===
An oak tree was located on its east side that is significant in regard of a suggestion that it was once used as a moot, court or justice hill and by association a gallows hill where a dule tree may have been located and where condemned male prisoners were executed whilst women were drowned in a pit. The Castle Knowe lies within the ancient Barony of Hunterston with its caput at the nearby Hunterston Castle.

== Structural remains ==
In 1816 the landowner, Mr R Hunter, reported that there were the appearances of an arch in the centre of the Castle Knowe that was orientated North to South. The remains of a drystone dyke in 2016 ran across the eastern side of the knowe and ran down to join the maintained dyke at the main road whilst in 1855 a drystone dyke ran across the end of the knowe on the western side. The source of the stone used for these dykes is not recorded. No structural remains are now visible at the site.

Castle knowe is now a sub-circular, grass-covered mound, about 20.0 m (65.6 ft) in diameter across the top, 4.0 m (13.1 ft) high on the North, and about 2.0 m (6.6 ft) on the South. The South side of the knowe shows clear indications of having been cut into, probably by ploughing and the placing of the drystone dyke shown on the 1855 map.

=== Tumulus ===
It has been considered to be a burial mound or tumulus. When the stone ramparts were removed in the 1890s an oblong cavity was uncovered in the centre that extended across the entire top of the mound and was about 6 to 8 ft (1.8 to 2.4 m) in width and depth. The walls were of neatly built drystone construction devoid of cement or mortar and the interior was filled with fallen earth and stones with no indication of what had formed the roof.

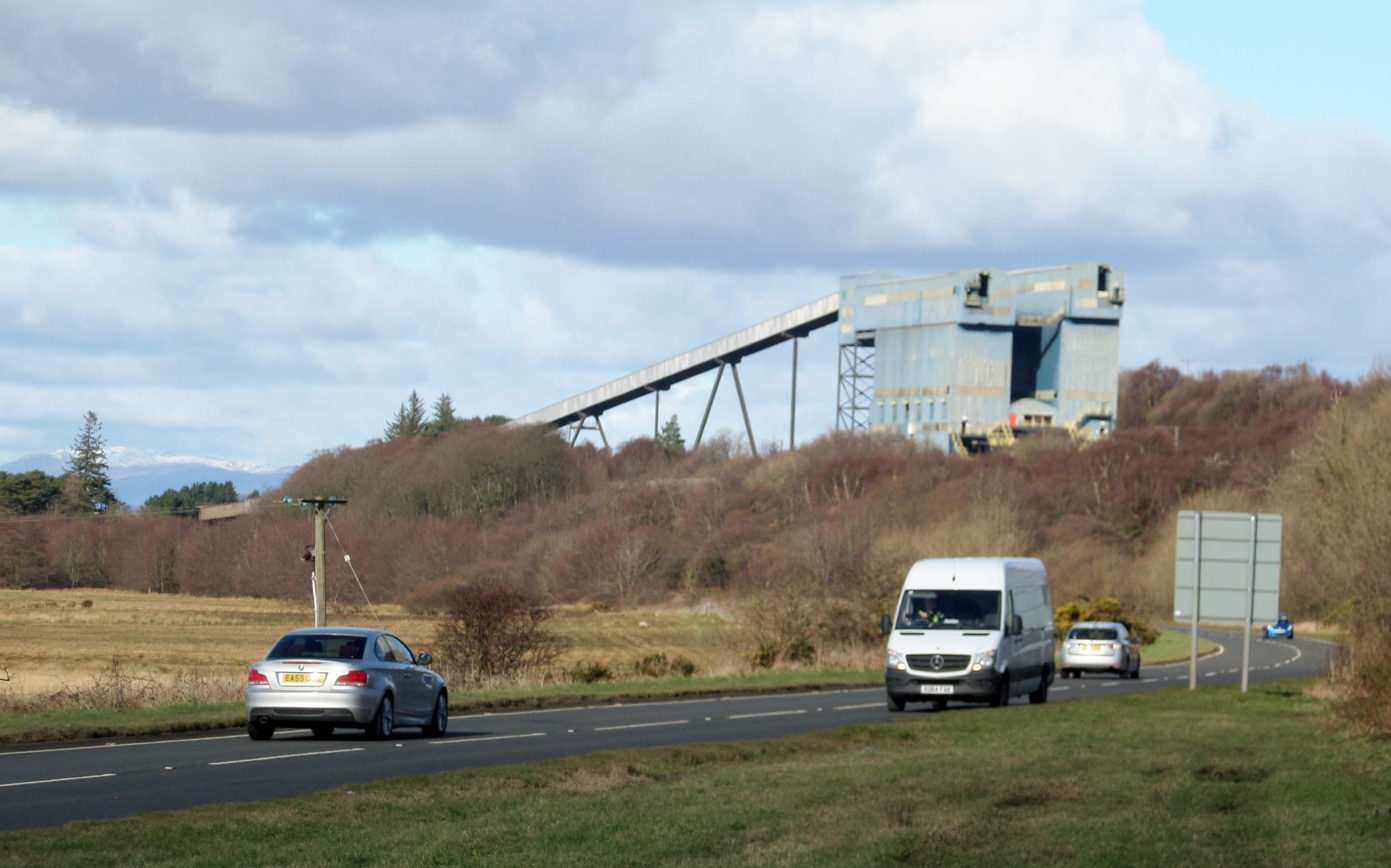
Kilruskin Woods and the Hunterston Conveyor terminus

=== Souterrain ===
Souterrains are not commonly known in the Ayrshire context however features such as the description of the oblong cavity and its lack of a stone roof are suggestive of these structures that are mainly known in Cornwall, Ireland and the North-East 'Pict lands' of Scotland.

=== Finds ===
It was reported in 1896 that querns or hand mills had been found in the area indicating dwellings nearby. although despite many years of ploughing at the site the farmer reported a lack of any finds.

== Kilruskin Toll ==
A toll house was once located near the Castle Knowe at the junction of the Kilruskin Road with the West Kilbride to Fairlie road.

== Micro-history ==
The Kilruskin Woods run up towards the old Hunterston Conveyor overbridge.

A water mill existed at North Kilruskin powered by the Kilruskin Burn and a mill pond with sluice arrangement. The mill worked using water power into the 1940s.
