= List of Baptists =

This list of Baptists covers those who were members of Baptist churches or raised in such. It does not imply that all were practicing Baptists or remained so all their lives. As an article of faith, Baptists baptize believers after conversion, not infants.

Abbreviations of countries: Australia (A); Brazil (Br); Burma (Bu); Canada (Ca); China (C); Rep. of Congo (Kinshasa) (CK); Rep. of Congo (Leopoldville) (CL); England (E); India (I); Isle of Man (IoM); Jamaica (J); Japan (Jp); New Zealand (NZ); Puerto Rico (PR); Romania (R); Scotland (S); Sri Lanka, Ceylon (SL); Ukraine (Uk); United States and previous colonies (US)

== Athletes ==
- Charles Barkley (born 1963, US), former professional basketball player
- Jim Brown (1936–2023, US), former fullback for the Cleveland Browns
- Roberto Clemente (1934–1972, PR)
- Mike Conley Jr. (born 1987, US), guard for the Minnesota Timberwolves basketball team
- Zach Johnson (born 1976, US), professional golfer, winner of 2007 Masters Tournament
- Magic Johnson (born 1959, US), professional basketball player
- Iris Kyle (born 1974, US), 10-time overall Ms. Olympia professional bodybuilder
- Ryan Langerhans (born 1980, US), outfielder for Seattle Mariners
- William Lockhart (1835–1893, S/E), cricketer and preacher
- Joe Louis (1914–1981, US), professional boxer. Holds the record for longest single reign as champion of any boxer in history.
- Dikembe Mutombo (1966–2024, CL/US) center for the Houston Rockets
- Bradbury Robinson (1884–1949, US), pioneering American football player, physician and conservationist
- Tim Tebow (born 1987, US), professional football quarterback, then baseball player
- Mike Tyson (born 1966, US), former boxer and heavyweight champion of the world, who later converted to Islam
- Reggie White (1961–2004, US), professional football defensive end; member of Pro Football Hall of Fame

== Authors and journalists ==
- Nathan Bailey (died 1742, E), philologist and lexicographer
- Clara Lucas Balfour (1808–1878, E), writer and temperance campaigner
- Ray Bradbury (1920–2012, US), science fiction author, later described himself as Buddhist
- Samuel Bagster the Younger (1800–1835, E) writer on religion and beekeeping
- Henlee Hulix Barnette (1911–2004, US), writer on Christian ethics
- Thomas Spencer Baynes (1823–1887, E), philosopher
- Henry Blackaby (living, Ca), writer on knowing God
- Frank W. Boreham (1871–1959, E/NZ), daily press contributions on religion
- Robbie Branscum (1934–1997, US), writer for children and young adults
- Edith Bryan (1872–1963, E/A), educationalist for children with special needs
- Tony Campolo (born 1935, US), sociologist and spiritual adviser
- Muriel Spurgeon Carder (1922–2023, Ca), writer on New Testament studies and pastoral care
- Ross Clifford (born 1951, A), theologian and political commentator
- Thomas Cooper (1805–1892, E), poet and Chartist
- Esther Copley (1786–1851, E), tractarian and writer for children
- Thomas Crosby (1683–1751, E), author of History of the English Baptists (1738–1740)
- W. E. Cule (1870–1944, W), children's author and editor of Baptist Missionary Society publications
- Elizabeth Dawbarn (died 1839, E), religious writer, preacher and pamphleteer
- Maria De Fleury (fl. 1773–1791, E), poet, hymnist and polemicist
- James T. Draper Jr. (born 1935, US), writer on Christian life
- Petru Dugulescu (1945–2008, R), writer on persecution
- Daniel C. Eddy (1823–1896, US), hymn writer and advocate of women's education
- Gene Edwards (born 1932, US), writer on church history and affairs
- Robert Ellis (born 1956, E), theologian
- William Roscoe Estep (1920–2000, US), historian
- Jerry Falwell Sr. (1933–2007, US), writer on social and political affairs
- Paul Fiddes (born 1947, E), theologian and novelist
- Sallie Rochester Ford (1828–1910, US), writer and newspaper editor
- Harry Emerson Fosdick (1878–1969, US), Modernist theologian
- Hans Frei (1922–1988, US), Bible scholar and theologian
- Gilberto Freyre (1900–1987, Br), sociologist and anthropologist
- Michael Frost (born 1961, A), missional and theologian
- Edwin Gaustad (1923–2011, US), scholar and historian of religion
- Billy Graham (1918–2018, US), worldwide evangelist
- Jack Graham (born 1950), writer on Christian life
- John Grisham (born 1955, US), novelist
- Ken Ham (born 1951, A/US), fundamentalist and creationist
- Roger E. Hedlund (born 1935, US/I), missionary and researcher
- Kent Hovind (born 1953, US), fundamentalist and creationist
- George Howells (1871–1955, W/I), writer and academic
- Mike Huckabee (born 1955, US), politician and writer on social and political affairs
- Donald Foster Hudson (1916–2003, E), missionary and educationalist
- Robert Don Hughes (born 1949, US), minister, educator and science fiction author
- Johnny Hunt (born 1952, US), writer on Christian life and biblical studies
- William Jones (1762–1846, W/E), writer and bookseller
- Adoniram Judson (1788–1850, US/Bu), missionary and producer of a Burmese Bible and a dictionary
- Tim LaHaye (1926–2016, US), co-author of the bestselling Left Behind series
- Doris Lester (1886–1965, E), religious writer and social worker
- Charles Lloyd (1766–1829, W/E), preacher and schoolmaster
- Bill Moyers (born 1934, US), television journalist and former White House Press Secretary
- David Owen (Dewi Wyn o Eifion) (1784–1841, W), Welsh-language poet
- Hazel Brannon Smith (1914–1994, US), journalist and editor; first female recipient of the Pulitzer Prize for Editorial Writing

== Criminals ==
- Edgar Ray Killen (1925 – 2018, US), sawmill operator, part-time Baptist minister, American Ku Klux Klan kleagle, directed murders of James Chaney, Andrew Goodman, Michael Schwerner (civil rights activists, Freedom Summer of 1964)
- Jesse James (1847–1882, US), outlaw, son of a Baptist minister, Confederate soldier
- Harry Longabaugh (1867–1908, US), "The Sundance Kid", train robber and outlaw

== Entertainers, movie and television personalities ==
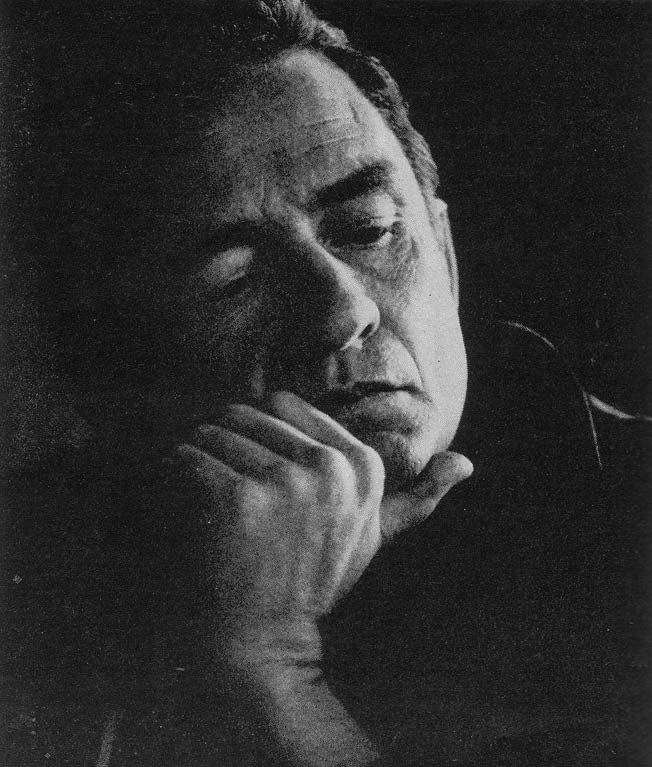
Johnny Cash

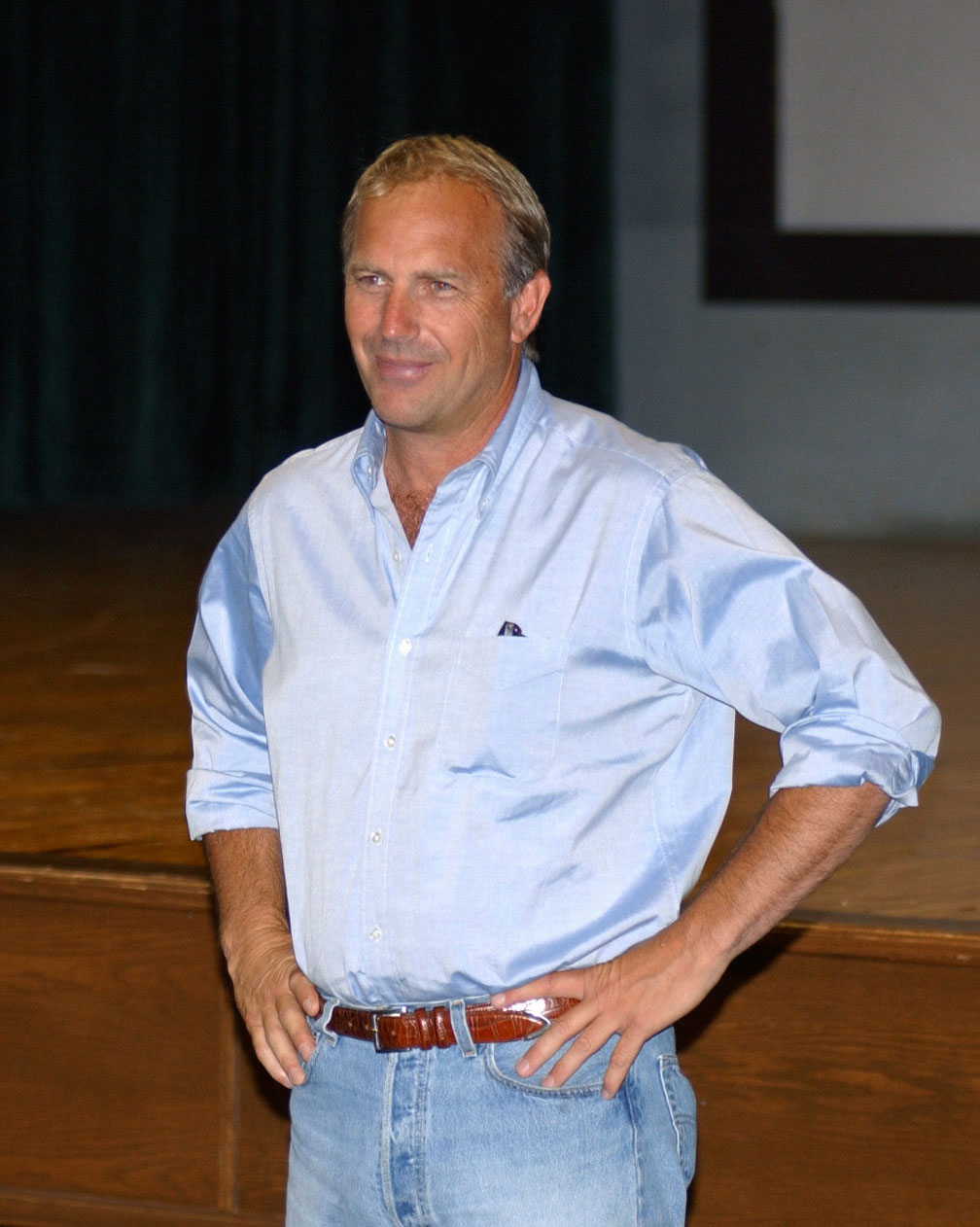
Kevin Costner

- Clay Aiken (born 1978, US) pop music singer
- Roy Acuff (1903–1992, US), country musician
- Warren Beatty (born 1937, US), actor
- David Bellamy (1933–2019, E), television presenter, botanist, and environmentalist
- Lead Belly (1888–1949, US), folk and blues musician
- Chuck Berry (1926–2017, US), singer, songwriter and one of the pioneers of rock and roll music (raised a Baptist)
- Spencer Bohren (1950–2019, US), American roots musician, raised a Baptist
- Glen Campbell (1936–2017, US), country music singer
- Mark Carman (born 1960, US), singer, composer, writer and producer
- Aaron Carter (1987–2022, US), singer
- Nick Carter (born 1980, US), lead vocalist of the Backstreet Boys
- Johnny Cash (1932–2003, US), country music singer
- Ray Charles (1930–2004, US), musician, singer, and composer
- Jerry Clower (1926–1998, US), rural humorist, member of the Grand Ole Opry, lay minister
- Kevin Costner (born 1955, US), actor
- Jill Dando (1961–1999, E) television presenter (murdered)
- Bette Davis (1908–1989, US), actress and erstwhile Baptist
- Jamie Foxx (born 1967, US), actor, singer and stand-up comedian
- Aretha Franklin (1942–2018, US), singer and daughter of Baptist minister Rev. C.L. Franklin
- Ava Gardner (1922–1990, US), actress
- Al Green (born 1946, US), singer, songwriter and record producer
- Buddy Holly (1936–1959, US), rock 'n' roll singer
- Whitney Houston (1963–2012, US), R&B/pop singer and actress
- John Hughes (1872–1914, W), composer and marketing manager
- John Hughes (1873–1932, W), composer of hymns
- Mahalia Jackson (1911–1972, US), gospel singer
- B.B. King (1925–2015, US), blues singer
- Gladys Knight (born 1944, US), singer, converted to Mormonism
- Avril Lavigne (born 1984, Ca), singer-songwriter and actress
- Brian Littrell (born 1975, US), pop singer, member of the Backstreet Boys
- Loretta Lynn (1932–2022, US), country music artist
- Reba McEntire (born 1955, US), country music artist and actress
- Brittany Murphy (1977–2009, US), actress, singer and voice artist; raised Baptist and later became non-denominational Christian
- Eddie Murphy (born 1961, US), actor
- Chuck Norris (1940–2026, US), actor
- Grady Nutt (1934–1982, US), Hee Haw regular (1979–1982), Baptist minister
- Brad Pitt (born 1963, US), actor, raised Baptist
- Dennis Quaid (born 1954, US), actor
- Corinne Bailey Rae (born 1979, E), singer and songwriter
- Diana Ross (born 1944, US), singer
- Willard Scott (born 1934, US), television weatherman
- Ron Shelton (born 1945, US), movie director
- Ashlee Simpson (born 1984, US), pop singer
- Jessica Simpson (born 1980, US), pop singer and actress
- Sinbad (born 1956 as David Adkins, US), actor and comedian
- Will Smith (born 1968, US) actor, raised baptist
- Snoop Dogg (born 1971 as Calvin Broadus, US), rapper, raised Baptist
- Britney Spears (born 1981, US), pop singer
- Octavia Spencer (born 1970, US), Academy Award-winning actress, producer, and author
- Irma Thomas (born 1941, US), soul singer
- Justin Timberlake (born 1981, US), pop singer
- Tina Turner (1939–2023, US), singer, converted to Buddhism
- Carrie Underwood (born 1983, US), country music singer
- Billy Vaughn (1919–1991, US), Big Band orchestra leader, songwriter, and saxophonist
- Stevie Wonder (born 1950, US), musician, singer, songwriter, and producer
- Oprah Winfrey (born 1954, US), raised Baptist, now a spiritualist
- Dan Whitney (Larry the Cable Guy) (born 1963, US), son of a Baptist preacher, attended Baptist University of America

== Industrialists and business leaders ==
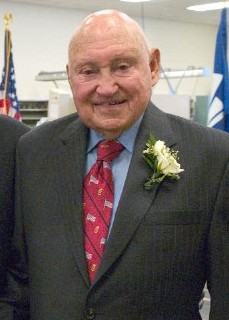
Truett Cathy

- George Fife Angas (1789–1879, E/A), businessman and banker prominent in the development of South Australia
- Thomas Burberry (1835–1926, E), founder of the Burberry chain of clothing stores
- S. Truett Cathy (1921–2014, US), billionaire founder of Chick-fil-A restaurants
- John Chapman (1801–1854, E), engineer and writer
- Eleanor Coade (1733–1821, E), businesswoman manufacturing statuary
- William Colgate (1783 – 1857), founded what became the Colgate-Palmolive company.

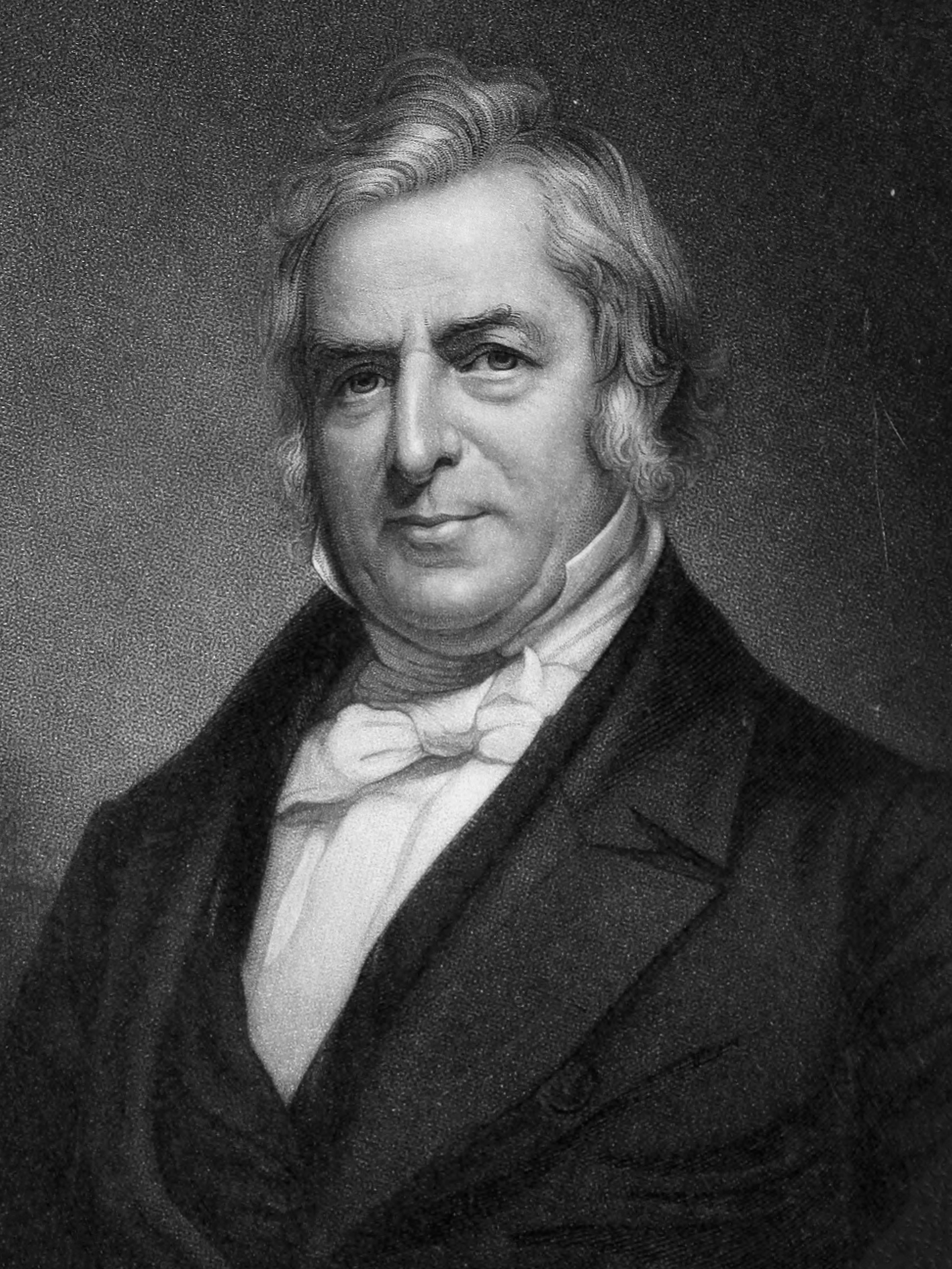
William Colgate

- Jeremiah Colman (1777–1851, E), founder of the Colman's Mustard company
- Thomas Cook (1808–1892, E), founder of the travel agency Thomas Cook & Son
- Carl Lindner (1919–2011, US), former owner of the Cincinnati Reds
- James Cash Penney (1875–1971, US), J. C. Penney department store magnate, son of a Primitive Baptist lay minister
- Thomas Ramsay (1858–1934, S), footwear manufacturer and lay preacher

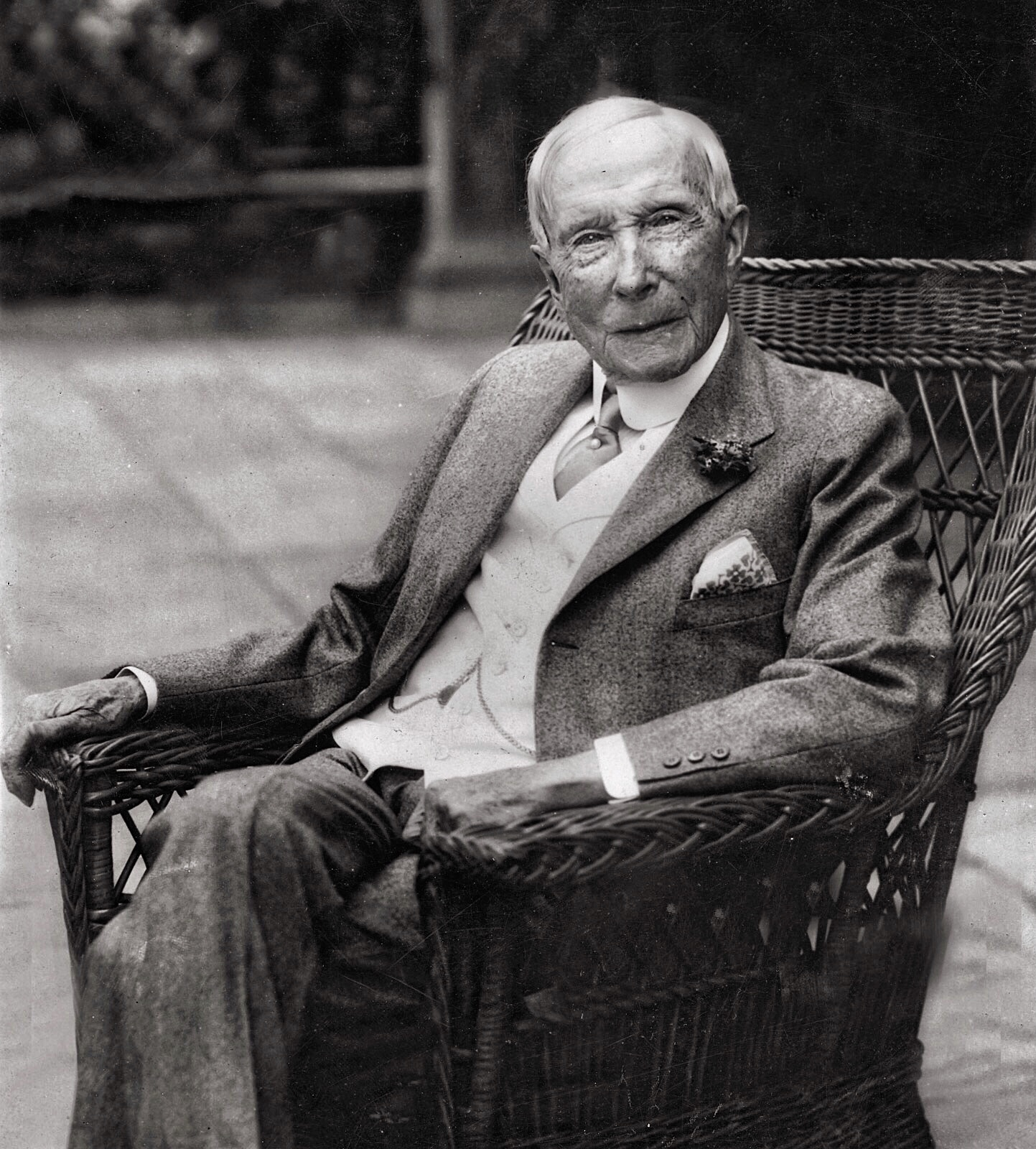
John D. Rockefeller

- John D. Rockefeller (1839–1937, US), 20th-century oil tycoon

== Jurists ==
- Clement Bailhache (1856–1924, E), commercial lawyer and judge
- Hugo Black (1886–1971, US), Supreme Court associate justice
- Charles Evans Hughes (1862–1948, US), Supreme Court chief justice
- Howell Edmunds Jackson (1832–1935, US), Supreme Court associate justice
- Robert Lush (1807–1881, E), judge and Privy Councillor
- Roy Moore (born 1947, US), Alabama State Supreme Court chief justice and Republican politician
- Clarence Thomas (born 1948, US), Supreme Court associate justice (converted to Catholicism)

== Politicians ==
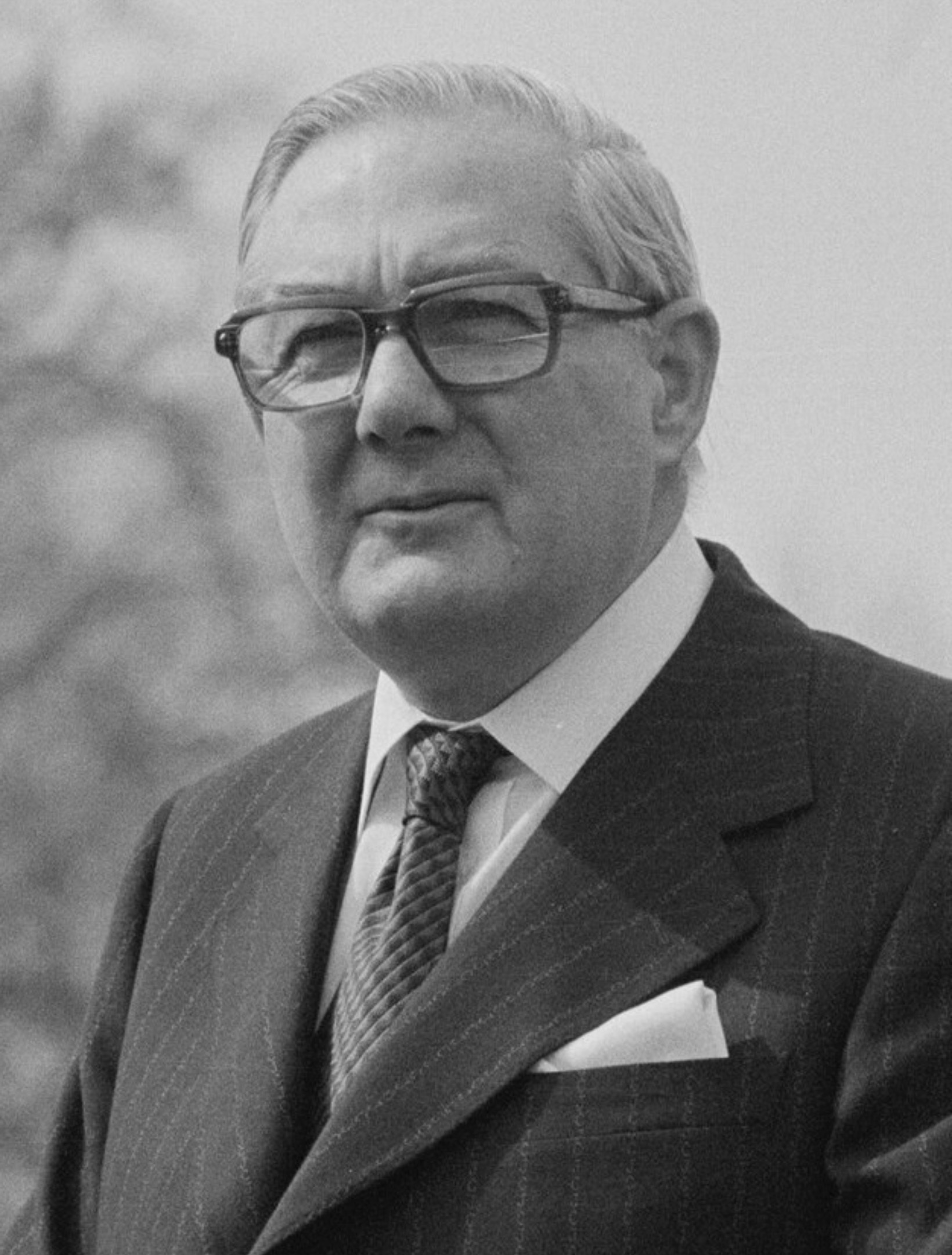
Prime Minister James Callaghan

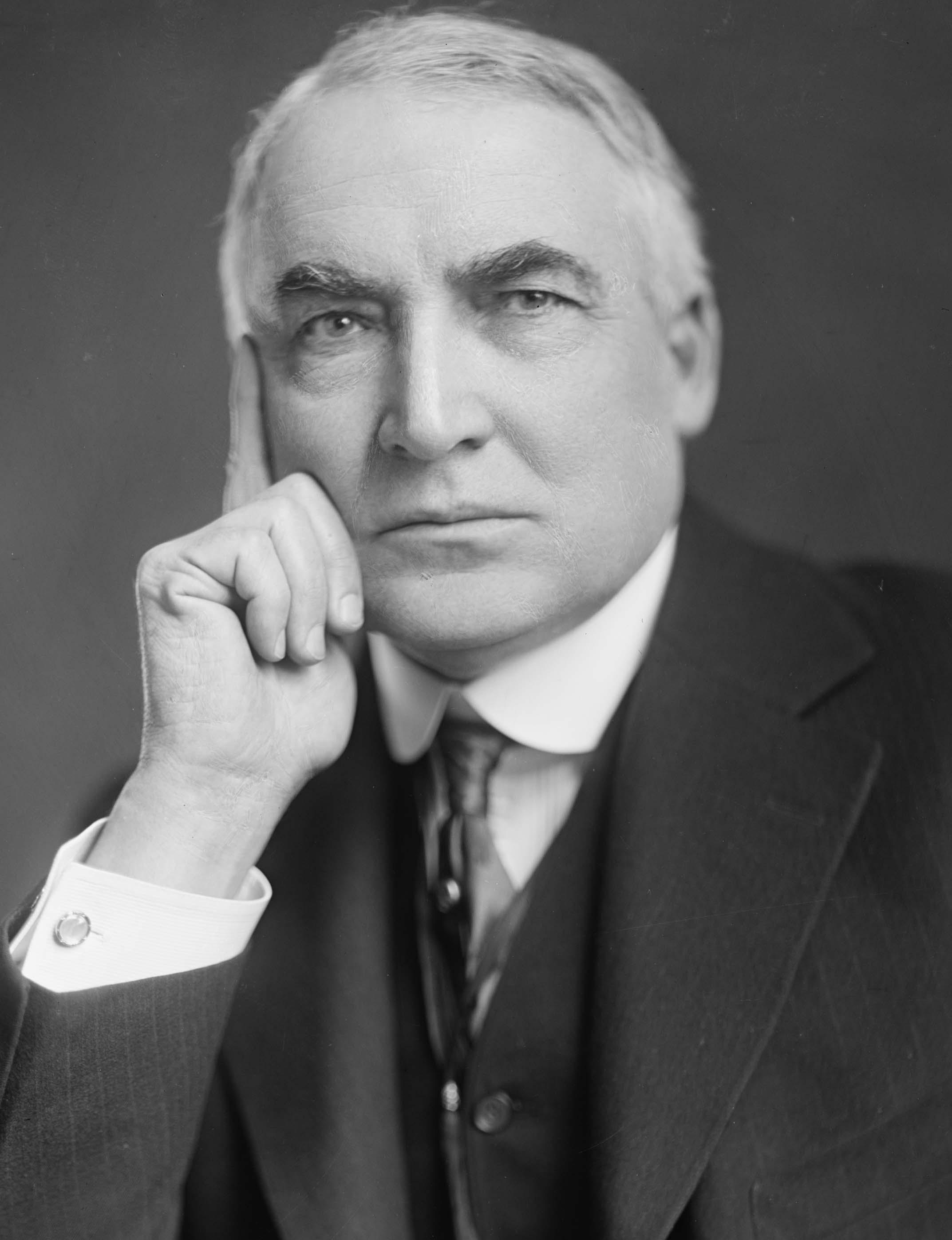
President Warren G. Harding

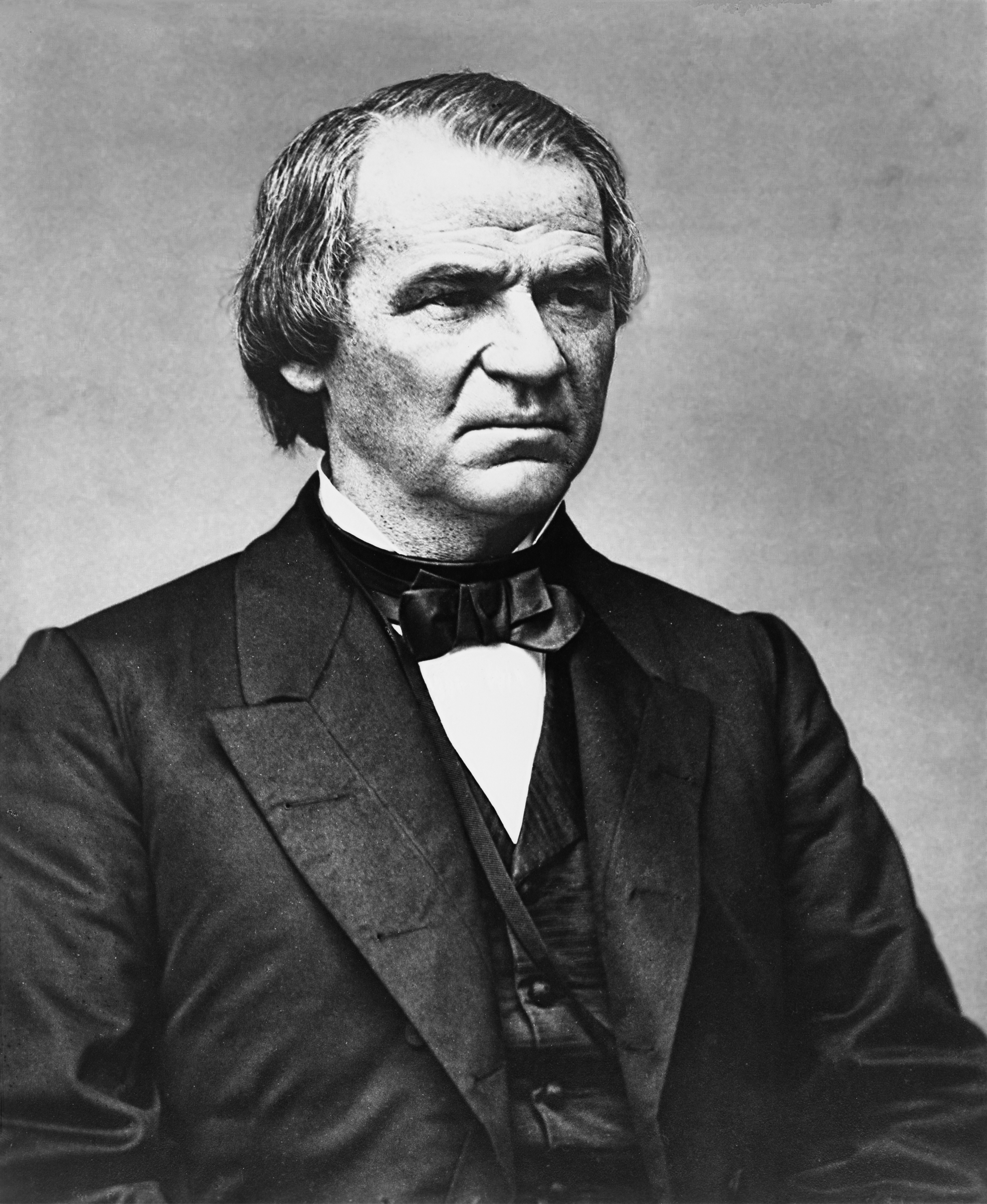
President Andrew Johnson

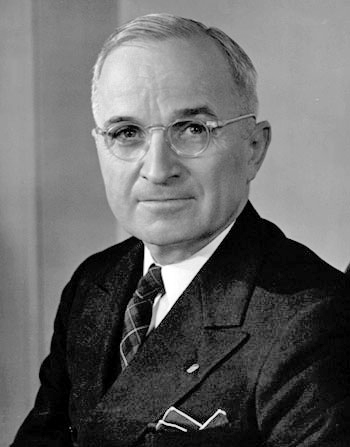
President Harry S. Truman

- Daniel Axtell (1622–1660, E), officer in the New Model Army, later executed as a regicide
- Richard M. Johnson (1780–1850, US), 9th Vice President of the United States (1837–41)
- George Goodman (1791–1859, E), Liberal Mayor of Leeds and MP
- Abraham Lincoln (1809–1865, US), 16th President of the United States, raised a Baptist.
- Reuben Barrow (1838–1918, E), Liberal politician and member of Parliament
- Warren G. Harding (1865–1923, US), 29th President of the United States
- Ernest Bevin (1881–1951, E), Labour politician and trade union leader
- Ichirō Hatoyama (1883–1959, Jp) 35th Prime Minister of Japan
- Harry Truman (1884–1972, US), 33rd President of the United States
- A. V. Alexander, 1st Earl Alexander of Hillsborough (1885–1965, E) Labour-Conservative politician and Minister of Defence
- Cyril Black (1902–1991, E), Conservative politician, member of Parliament, and businessman
- Nelson Rockefeller (1908–1979, US), 41st Vice President of the United States (1974–1977)
- James Callaghan (1912–2005, E), British Prime Minister (1976–1979, E) and leader of the Labour Party (1976–1980)
- Audrey Callaghan (1915–2005, E), Labour Party councilor and wife of Prime Minister James Callaghan
- Jimmy Carter (1924–2024, US), 39th President of the United States
- Bill Clinton (born 1946, US), 42nd President of the United States
- Chuck Colson (1931–2012, US), senior aide to President Richard Nixon
- Steven D. Foster, Maine state representative
- Yukio Hatoyama (born 1947, Jp), 60th Prime Minister of Japan
- Al Gore (born 1948, US), 45th Vice President of the United States
- Kamala Harris (born 1964, US), 49th Vice President of the United States
- Mike Huckabee (born 1955, US), former governor of Arkansas (R) and 2008 Presidential candidate
- Jesse Jackson (1941–2026, US), American civil rights activist and Baptist minister; candidate for Democratic presidential nomination in 1984 and 1988; shadow senator for District of Columbia from 1991 to 1997
- Norman Kember (born 1931, US), biophysics professor and pacifist
- Muriel Lester (1883–1968, E), social activist and pacifist
- Elizabeth Lilburne (fl. 1641–1660, E), Leveller
- Edmund Ludlow (c. 1617–1692, E), parliamentarian and regicide
- John McCain (1936–2018, US), Senator (R) Arizona, presidential candidate
- George Hay Morgan (1866–1931, W/E), Liberal UK politician
- Ron Paul (born 1935, US), Congressman (R) and former Libertarian Party presidential candidate; known for his libertarian leanings
- Wynne Samuel (1912–1989, W), politician
- Alfred Thomas, 1st Baron Pontypridd (1840–1927, W), Welsh Liberal politician
- Oleksandr Turchynov (Олександр Валентинович Турчинов, born 1964, Uk), interim President of Ukraine since 23 February 2014

== Preachers and theologians ==
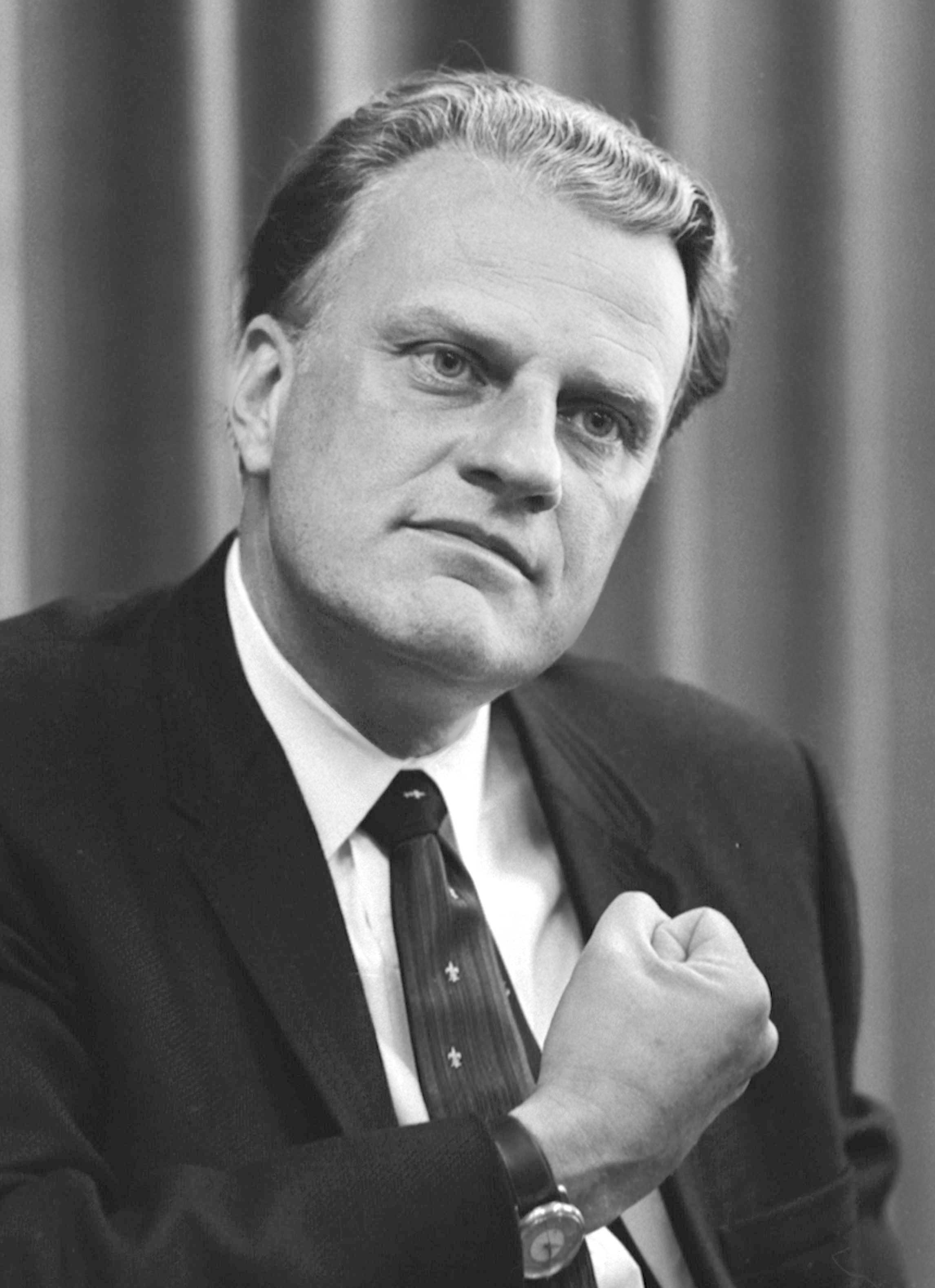
Billy Graham

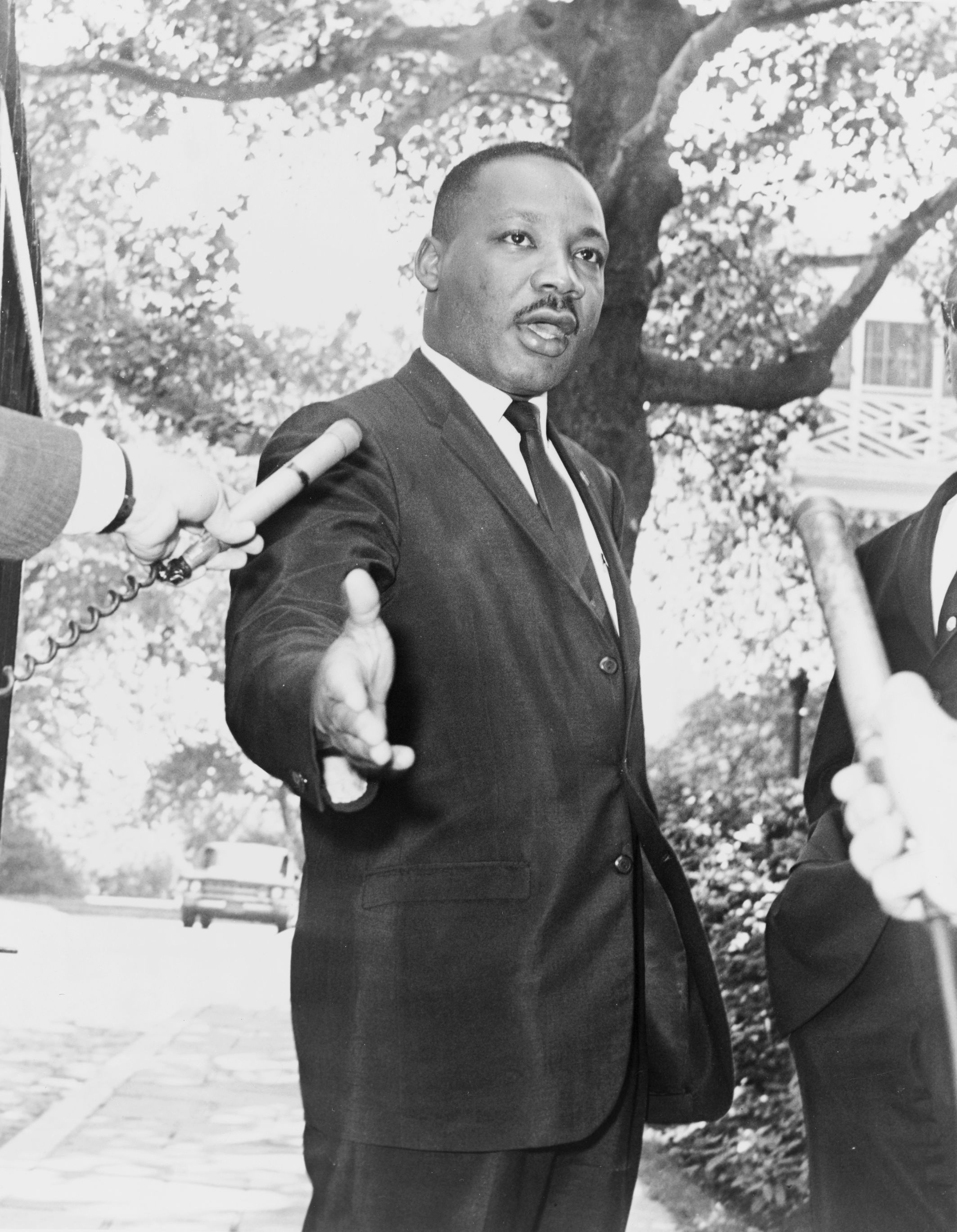
Martin Luther King Jr.

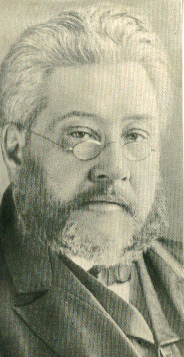
C. H. Spurgeon, "The Prince of Preachers"

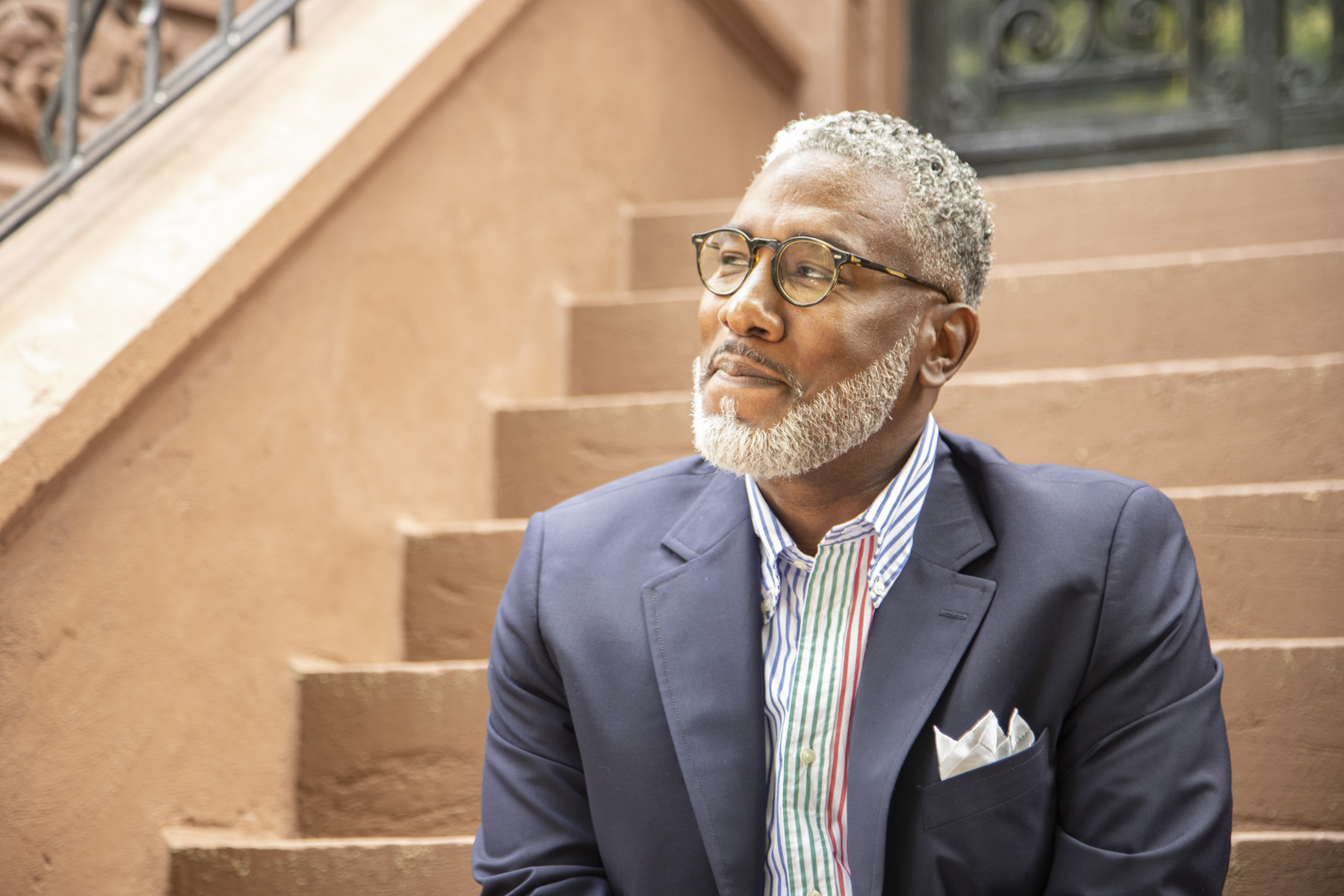
Conrad Tillard

- Ralph Abernathy (1926–1990, US), pastor and civil rights activist
- William Adam (1796–1881, S/I), missionary
- John Allen (c. 1741/1742–1780s, E/US), preacher and radical
- Steven Anderson (born 1981), preacher
- Joseph Angus (1816–1902, E), preacher and biblical scholar
- Annie Armstrong (1850–1938, US), missionary organizer; the SBC's Easter mission offering is collected in her honor
- Melbourn Aubrey (1885–1957, W/E), minister, ecumenist, and General Secretary of the Baptist Union of Great Britain and Ireland
- Charles C. Baldwin (born 1947, US), Chief of Chaplains of the U.S. Air Force, 2004–2008
- Jeremy Balfour (born 1967, S), preacher and politician
- Alistair Begg (born 1952, S/US), preacher
- Francis Bellamy (1855–1931, US), minister and author of the Pledge of Allegiance
- Margaret Bevan (c. 1894 – post-1940s, W/US), evangelist and singer
- John Birch (1918–1945, US), missionary to China and anti-communist
- James Black (1797–1886, S/Ca), preacher and evangelist
- Abraham Booth (1734–1806, E), preacher and religious writer
- David Bowen (1774–1853, W), preacher
- Samuel Breeze (1772–1812, W), preacher and schoolteacher
- Hugh Stowell Brown (1823–1886, IoM), preacher and activist
- Charles Bulkley (1719–1797, E), preacher
- Thomas Burchell (1799–1846, J), missionary
- John G. Burkhalter (1909–1992, US), U.S. Army Chaplain in World War II and Korean War
- Dawson Burns (1828–1909, E), preacher and temperance campaigner
- Matthew Caffyn (1628–1714, E), preacher and writer
- Tony Campolo (born 1935, US), pastor and professor of sociology
- William Carey (1761–1834, India), missionary
- Benajah Harvey Carroll (1843–1914, US), pastor, theologian, founding president of Southwestern Baptist Theological Seminary
- J. M. Carroll (1852–1931, US), pastor and author of The Trail of Blood
- Charles Henry Carter (1828–1914, SL), missionary and translator of Old Testament, Book of Psalms, and New Testament into Sinhalese;
- Douglas Carver (born 1951, US), Major General who served as Chief of Chaplains of the United States Army
- Oswald Chambers (1874–1917, S), pastor and author of My Utmost for His Highest, son of a converted pastor
- Oren B. Cheney (1816–1903, US), abolitionist and founder of Bates College
- John T. Christian (1854–1925), US, church historian
- Dr. John Clarke (1609–1676, US), medical doctor, early proponent of separation of church and state
- Walter Thomas Conner (1877–1952, US), Professor of Theology at Southwestern Baptist Theological Seminary
- Elijah Craig (1738–1808), preacher, educator and entrepreneur, purported inventor of bourbon whiskey
- W. A. Criswell (1909–2002, US), pastor, President of the Southern Baptist Convention, founder of Criswell College
- David Crosley (1670–1744, E), evangelist and pastor
- Henry Danvers, (died 1687, E), preacher and radical
- Charles Davies (1849–1927, W), preacher
- David Davies (1794–1856, W), preacher and college principal
- David Christopher Davies (1878–1958, W/CK), missionary in Congo
- Gwilym Davies (1879–1955, W), preacher and peace activist
- Henry Davies (1753–1825, W), preacher
- Jacob Davies (1816–1849, W/SL), preacher and missionary
- Owen Davies (1840–1929, W), preacher and college lecturer
- George Dawson (1821–1876, E), preacher and lecturer
- Miguel A. De La Torre (born 1958, US), prolific author on Hispanic religiosity
- Henry Denne (c. 1606–1660, E), preacher and controversialist
- Isaac Eaton (1724–1772, US), preacher and founder of the Hopewell Academy
- Morgan Edwards (1722–1792, W/US), preacher and religious historian
- Benjamin Evans (1844–1900, W), preacher and local politician
- Christmas Evans (1766–1838, W), preacher
- John Evans (1767–1827, W), preacher
- Jerry Falwell (1933–2007, US), televangelist, founder of the Moral Majority
- Enoch Francis (1688–1740, W), preacher and religious writer
- John Gano (1727–1804, US), founding pastor of the First Baptist Church in the City of New York, chaplain in the Continental Army, and alleged baptizer of General George Washington
- John Gill (1697–1771, US), pastor and theologian
- Benjamin Godwin (1785–1881, E), abolitionist leader in Bradford
- George Gould (1818–1882, E), preacher in Norwich
- Billy Graham (1918–2018, US), evangelist
- Peter Grant (1783–1867, S), preacher
- George Grenfell (1849–1906, E), missionary and explorer
- John Griffith (c. 1622–1700, E), preacher, founder of a London congregation
- James Griffiths (1856–1943, W), preacher and President of the Baptist Union of Wales
- W. J. Gruffydd (1916–2011, W), preacher and poet
- Robert Hall (1728–1791, E), preacher and theologian
- Robert Hall (1764–1831, E), preacher and theologian
- Mordecai Ham (1877–1961, US), tent revivalist who preached the sermon that converted Billy Graham
- John Harper (1872–1912, S/E), preacher
- John Harris (c. 1725–1801, E), preacher and controversialist
- Joseph Harris (1773–1825, W), preacher, poet and editor
- Obadiah Holmes (1610–1682, US), New England Baptist minister whipped in Boston for his beliefs; pastor at Newport, Rhode Island
- Kent Hovind (1953–), preacher, evangelist
- Thomas Humphreys (died 1909, W), preacher and local councillor
- Johnny Hunt (born 1952, US), author and once President of the Southern Baptist Convention
- Curtis Hutson (1934–1995), preacher, baptist newspaper editor
- Jack Hyles (1926–2001, US), pastor and prominent identity in the Independent Baptist movement
- Joseph Ivimey (1773–1834, E), preacher and religious historian
- David Bevan Jones (1807–1863, W), preacher and controversialist
- Clarence Jordan (1912–1969, US), pastor and author of The Cotton Patch Gospel
- William Kiffin (1616–1701, E), London minister, politician and wool merchant
- Grantham Killingworth (1699–1778, E), controversialist
- Isaac Kimber (1692–1955, E), preacher and biographer
- Martin Luther King Sr. (1899–1984, US), pastor, missionary, an early figure in the civil rights movement
- Martin Luther King Jr. (1929–1968, US), martyred civil rights leader, Nobel Peace Prize recipient
- Kenneth Scott Latourette (1884–1968, US/C), pastor; missionary and church historian
- Titus Lewis (1773–1811, W), preacher and lexicographer
- John F. MacArthur (1939–2025, US), pastor and theologian
- Andrew MacBeath (20th century, S), preacher and writer
- John MacBeath (1880–1967, S/E), preacher
- Hugh Martin (1890–1964, S/E), preacher and publisher
- Benjamin Meredith (1700–1749, W), preacher
- Albert Mohler (born 1959, US), author and president of The Southern Baptist Theological Seminary (1993 -) and Boyce College in Louisville, Kentucky.
- Charlotte ("Lottie") Diggers Moon (1840–1912, US/C), missionary; the SBC's Christmas missionary offering is named in her honor.
- Abel Morgan (1673–1722, W), minister and religious writer
- David Eirwyn Morgan (1918–1982, W), minister, college tutor and politician
- William Morris (1843–1922, W) minister and President of the Baptist Union of Wales
- J. Frank Norris (1877–1952, US), preacher and Christian fundamentalist
- Ernest Alexander Payne (1902–1980, E), religious writer and General Secretary of the Baptist Union of Great Britain
- Fred Phelps (1929–2014, US), minister opposed to funerals of homosexuals and servicemen
- John Piper (born 1946, US), preacher at Bethlehem Baptist Church in Minneapolis; head of Desiring God
- Thomas Price (1820–1888, W), preacher and politician
- R Guy Ramsay (1895–1976, S), preacher and religious writer
- Morgan John Rhys (1760–1804, W/US), preacher and politician
- John R. Rice (1895–1980), preacher, baptist newspaper editor
- William Richards (1749–1818, W/E), preacher and lexicographer
- Adrian Rogers (1931–2005, US), televangelist
- Lester Roloff (1914–1982), preacher, educator
- Peter Ruckman (1921–2016), preacher, author
- David Syme Russell (1916–2010, S/E), theologian and General Secretary of the Baptist Union of Great Britain
- Frances Shimer (1826–1901, US), founder of Shimer College
- John Smyth (c. 1554–1612, E), founding pastor of first English-speaking Baptist church
- C. H. Spurgeon (1834–1892, E), pastor known as "The Prince of Preachers"
- Charles Stanley (1932–2023, US), televangelist founder of In Touch Ministries
- Jeff Struecker (born 1969, US), pastor, author and former U.S. Army Ranger Chaplain
- Joshua Thomas (1719–1797, W), preacher and religious historian
- John Albert Broadus (1827 –1895, US), pastor, professor of New Testament interpretation and a president of the Southern Baptist Theological Seminary.
- Conrad Tillard, politician, Baptist minister, radio host, author, and activist
- Neiliezhü Üsou (1941–2009, I), theologian, church musician, music teacher and composer from the Nagaland, North-East India
- Lewis Valentine (1893–1986, W), preacher, politician and author
- Paul Washer (born 1961, US), founder of HeartCry Missionary Society
- Sidney Abram Weltmer (1858–1930, US), Baptist preacher, professor, magnetic pealer, mental scientist; from Nevada, Missouri; founder of Weltmer Institute for Suggestive Therapeutics and American School of Magnetic Healing.
- Rhydwen Williams (1916–1997, W), preacher, poet and novelist
- Roger Williams (1603–1683, E/US), founded First Baptist Church in America
- Jonathan Woodhouse (born 1955, W), British Army chaplain and preacher
- Nigel G. Wright (born 1949, E), theologian, writer and President of the Baptist Union of Great Britain (2002–2013)

== Others ==
- Larry Birkhead (born 1973, US), father of Anna Nicole Smith's daughter, Dannielynn Hope Marshall Birkhead
- Brian Bluhm (1982–2007, US), one of the students killed in the Virginia Tech massacre and a member of the Baptist Collegiate Ministry
- Alfred James Broomhall (1911–1994, E), missionary to southern Sichuan
- David Crockett Graham (1884–1961, US), polymath and missionary to Sichuan
- Martha Gurney (1733–1816, E), printer, bookseller and abolitionist
- Henry Havelock (1795–1857, E), British army general in India
- Paul Hobson (died 1666, E), New Model Army soldier in the English Civil War and controversialist
- Edith Killgore Kirkpatrick (1918–2014, US), Executive Board member of the Louisiana Baptist Convention
- Newton Knight (1829–1922, US), Confederate deserter who led a band of escaped slaves
- Malcolm X (1925–1965, US), raised Baptist, but later converted to Islam

== Fictional Baptists ==
=== Film ===
- Arachnophobia: Coach Beachwood, his wife, daughter (Becky) and son (Bobby)
- The Best Little Whorehouse in Texas: Sheriff Ed Earl Dodd says that he was raised a Baptist.
- O Brother, Where Art Thou?: Pete Hogwallop and Delmar O'Donnell are baptized by a Baptist minister.
- The Preacher's Wife: Pastor Henry Biggs (Courtney Vance), his wife Julia (Whitney Houston), his mother-in-law Margueritte Coleman (Jenifer Lewis), his son Jeremiah (Justin Pierre Edmund) and many other characters were members of St. Matthew's Baptist Church.

=== Music ===
- "Preachin Blues" (Son House) contains the lines

Yes, I'm gonna get me religion, I'm gonna join the Baptist Church.
You know I wanna be a Baptist preacher, just so I won't have to work.

- "Cowboys Days" (Terri Clark) contains the lines

I was third alto on the second row of the First Baptist church choir
I was keeper of the minutes for the Tri Delts, in charge of the homecoming bonfire
I was a straight 'A', straight laced, level-headed as they come
And parked at the Sonic, isn't that ironic, when my whole world came undone
One slot over was a calf roper giving me his George Strait smile
And before I knew Miss Good-Two-Shoes was two-steppin', runnin' wild.

- "Guilty" (The Statler Brothers) contains the lines

If she seems bitter of other ways,
Seems to have lost her Baptist ways,
If the truth comes harder than a lie,
If she's guilty, so am I

- "Lonely Lubbock Lights" (Aaron Watson), a singer at the Broken Spoke (a honky-tonk bar) reveals that a love interest is the daughter of a Baptist minister who is keeping them apart (because he sings in bars).
- "Southern Baptist Heartbreak" (The Warren Brothers) contains the lines

Somewhere in the middle of "Have Thy Own Way,"
She left an empty pew;
She said 'I think that's what I'll do.'"

- "Uneasy Rider" (Charlie Daniels), a hippie is stranded in a bar in the deep South and the locals start making trouble when the fast-thinking hippie accuses one of the locals of being a spy sent to infiltrate the Ku Klux Klan. The local replies that he's a "faithful follower of Brother John Birch and a member of Antioch Baptist Church."

=== Literature ===
- Fried Green Tomatoes at the Whistle Stop Cafe, by Fannie Flagg
  - Idgie Threadgood
  - Rev. Scroggins
- The Mitford series by Jan Karon
  - Sophia Burton, single mother raising two daughters
  - Absalom Greer, elderly minister and friend of the series'protagonist, Father Tim Kavanagh (Episcopalian rector).
  - Madelaine Kavanagh, Father Tim's mother
  - Emma Newland, Father Tim's secretary, raised Baptist, converted to Episcopal, returned to Baptist church on marriage.
  - Harold Newland, Emma's husband and local postal worker
  - Rodney Underwood, town's chief of police
  - Lew Boyd, owner-operator of local Exxon gas station
  - Mule Skinner, semi-retired realtor
  - Fancy Skinner, Mule's wife and unisex hairdresser
  - Bill Sprouse, jovial minister of Mitford's First Baptist Church
- To Kill a Mockingbird by Harper Lee
  - Miss Maudie Atkins, neighbor of Scout Finch, protagonist; more moderate than "Footwashing Baptists" who make a brief appearance
  - Mr. Radley's father, another of Scout's neighbors
- Superman comic book series
  - Perry White, editor of the Daily Planet

=== Television ===
- Designing Women, Julia Sugarbaker (Dixie Carter), presumably Suzanne Sugarbaker (Delta Burke) and Charlene Frazier (Jean Smart). Specifically, Charlene reveals that she is a "First Baptist" in the episode "Oh Suzanna". In the episode "How Great Thou Art" Charlene quits her church when she discovers her pastor is opposed to the ordination of women, which was her dream at one time. Mary Jo Shively (Annie Potts) briefly dates Julia's minister.
- Sanford And Son, Fred Sanford's (Redd Foxx) former sister-in-law, Aunt Esther (LaWanda Page) is a devout Baptist who often annoys Fred with her constant bible-thumping.
- The Jeffersons, George Jefferson (Sherman Hemsley) is revealed to be a Baptist during the third season in "The Christmas Wedding" episode where his son Lionel (Damon Evans) weds Jenny Willis (Berlinda Thomas). The wedding is held up because George wants a Baptist minister to conduct the service while the Willises want a minister of their denomination. Jenny and Lionel quickly marry when a minister (Robert Sampson) (who happens to be Baptist though white, to George's chagrin), is going door-to-door with a group of carolers.
- Gimme a Break!, Nell Harper (Nell Carter) is the daughter of a Baptist minister.
- Golden Girls, Blanche Deveraux (Rue McClanahan) is a Southern Baptist
- The Grady Nutt Show, Rev. Grady Williams (Grady Nutt), a minister in a short-lived sitcom on NBC who balances family and ministry as he does in the pilot episode where he must preach the funeral of a disliked man while coming to terms with teenage daughter's dating.
- LA Law, Jane Halliday (Alexandra Powers), fundamentalist Baptist and attorney, alumna of Bob Jones University. Introduced to the series in the eighth season premiere, when she revealed she intended to remain a virgin until her wedding night.
- The Waltons, almost all principal characters were Baptists or attended the Baptist church. In the fourth-season episode "The Sermon", Rev. Matthew Fordwick (John Ritter) asks John Boy (Richard Thomas) to deliver a sermon while he goes on honeymoon. In the fifth-season episode "The Baptism", John Walton Sr. (Ralph Waite) refuses to attend a tent revival or be baptized.
- Young Sheldon, young Sheldon Cooper, raised a Baptist, lacks a belief in God. In the 2019 episode "Albert Einstein and the Story of Another Mary", he considers converting to Judaism to emulate famous scientists like Albert Einstein, but abandons this, telling his parents he will remain "the atheist Baptist you know and love."

== See also ==
- List of Christian theologians
- List of preachers
- List of Southern Baptist Convention affiliated people
