= John Wiche =

John Wiche may refer to:

- John Wakeman (died 1549), English Benedictine, also known as John Wiche
- John Wiche (Baptist) (1718–1794), English Baptist minister
