= John MacBeath =

- Born: c. 1880
- Died: May 3, 1967 (aged 86–87)
- Occupations: Preacher; Baptist minister; author
- Known for: Minister of Cambuslang Baptist Church; Minister of Haven Green Baptist Church
- Spouse(s): Margaret (d. 1947); Eleanor Millard
- Relatives: Andrew MacBeath (brother)

John MacBeath (c. 1880 - 3 May 1967) was a Scottish preacher, minister of Cambuslang Baptist Church from 1909 to 1921 or 1922. He was later minister of Haven Green Baptist Church, Ealing, from 1942 to 1949. His first wife Margaret died during this pastorate, on 16 November 1947. He then remarried to Eleanor Millard. He himself died 3 May 1967 aged 87 years. His funeral took place from Haven Green Baptist Church, of which he was Pastor Emeritus. His younger brother, Andrew MacBeath, formerly Principal of the Bible Training Institute, Glasgow, took part.

== Published works ==
- "Afterward!" A study of the word in the Epistle to the people
- The Carpenter of Nazareth. Talks about His tools, etc
- The Circle of Time
- The Conquest of Kingdoms. The Story of the B.M.S. (Baptist Missionary Society)
- The Face of Christ
- The Fragrant Life. Mrs. John MacBeath. Gleanings from her diaries and notes of addresses given by her at meetings in Scotland and England, compiled by her husband, Rev. John MacBeath
- The Gift of Wings
- The Hills of God
- In Time of Trouble. The counsel of the Big Fisherman. [On the first Epistle of St. Peter.]
- Lamps and Lamplighters
- The Life of a Christian. [Addresses on the Epistle to the Ephesians.]
- Lilies among the Wheat. Talks to young people
- Loyalty to Jesus Christ. The test and triumph of religion. The presidential address at the Annual Assembly, Glasgow, of the Baptist Union of Scotland ... 1934
- A Number of Things. Talks to young people
- People without a Name, and other studies in simple Christian discipleship
- Poppies. [On the wearing of the poppy in memory of those who died in the Great War.]
- Roadmakers and Roadmenders
- The Round of the Year. Portraits of the months
- The Second Watch
- The Silence
- The Silent Bells
- Taken Unawares
- Thirty Pieces of Silver. A price with a history
- To the Bereaved in War

Source: COPAC

- A Wayfarer's Psalter 1944 Marshall, Morgan & Scott
