= St Peter's Church, Arnesby =

Church in Arnesby, Leicestershire

Coordinates: 52°31′26″N 1°05′30″W

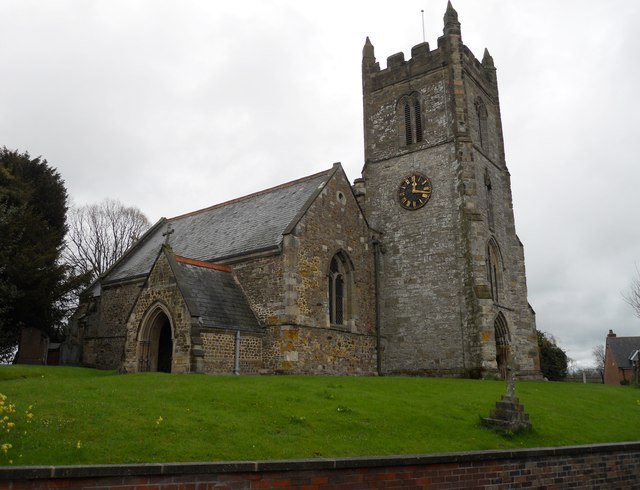
- Denomination: Church of England

History
- Dedication: St Peter

Administration
- Diocese: Leicester
- Parish: Arnesby, Leicestershire

Clergy
- Rector: Liz Bickley

St Peter's Church is a church in Arnesby, Leicestershire. It is a Grade II* listed building.

== History ==
The church consists of a nave, chancel, north porch, tower, vestry and north and south aisles. The tower dates from the 13th century and has an external turret, renewed shafts, arch mouldings, a west window dating from c15th century, west door, Y-tracery bell openings, lancet windows, pinnacles and battlements.

The arcades are thought to date from the early 12th century. The third bay is thought to have been added c1300, the same time as the south aisle. The chancel, which is thought to date from c1330, has large windows at the side and the east window is reticulated.

The clerestory was built in the 15th century. The south aisle wall was rebuilt during the 1866–67 restoration by Millican and Smith as were other parts of the church.
