= Robert Hall, the elder =

Robert Hall, the elder (1728–1791) was an English Particular Baptist minister, known as an proponent of Fullerism and an opponent of so-called hyper-Calvinism.

== Life ==
Hall was a pastor at Arnesby in Leicestershire. His ministry extended into parts of Warwickshire.

== Works ==
Help to Zion's Travellers (1781) analysed doctrinal difficulties facing Baptists of the older hyper-Calvinist school in accepting his views. Influential in that school were the teachings of Tobias Crisp, Richard Davis, and Joseph Hussey, through John Brine and John Gill.

== Family ==
Hall married Jane Catchaside, and they had a family of 14 children. The youngest of those, Robert Hall, the younger, was also a Baptist minister, and became better known than his father.
