= George Beasley-Murray =

English religious scholar

George Raymond Beasley-Murray
- Born: 10 October 1916; London
- Died: 23 February 2000 (aged 83); Brighton, England
- Occupations: Principal of Spurgeon's College, London, and Professor of New Testament Interpretation at Southern Baptist Theological Seminary
- Spouse: Ruth
- Children: Four including Rev. Paul Beasley-Murray
- Awards: Honorary DD from McMaster University, Canada

Academic background
- Education: London University; Jesus College, Cambridge (D.D.)

Academic work
- Discipline: New Testament studies
- Institutions: Southern Baptist Theological Seminary
- Notable works: Baptism in the New Testament, The Book of Revelation

George Raymond Beasley-Murray (October 10, 1916 – 23 February 2000) was an evangelical Christian and prominent Baptist scholar, Principal of Spurgeon's College, London, and later Professor of New Testament Interpretation at Southern Baptist Theological Seminary. He is known particularly for what became the standard work on Baptism in the New Testament (1962), and his major study of Jesus and the Kingdom of God (1986). He received his D.D. from Jesus College, Cambridge.

== Life ==
Beasley-Murray was born in London, and studied at Spurgeon's College. He served as pastor of Ashurst Drive Baptist Church, while also studying at King's College, London. Beasley-Murray taught at the International Baptist Theological Seminary in Rüschlikon, Switzerland before becoming principal of Spurgeon's College in 1958. He served in this role until 1973. He then became the James Buchanan Harrison Professor of New Testament at Southern Baptist Theological Seminary, a post he held until 1980.

Beasley-Murray married Ruth Weston on 4 April 1942 and they had four children. Their son Paul is also a Baptist pastor.

In 1988, a Festschrift was published in his honour. Eschatology and the New Testament: Essays in Honor of George Raymond Beasley-Murray included contributions from R. E. Clements, James D. G. Dunn, F. F. Bruce, C. K. Barrett, Ralph P. Martin and I. Howard Marshall.

The George Beasley-Murray Memorial lecture ran for 10 years between 2002 and 2012.

== Selected works ==
- Beasley-Murray, George Raymond (1954). Jesus and the Future: An Examination of the Criticism of the Eschatological Discourse, Mark 13, with special Reference to the Little Apocalypse Theory. London: Macmillan. OCLC 563076783.
- ——— (1963). Baptism in the New Testament. Exeter: Paternoster. OCLC 913361278.
- ——— (1966). Baptist Today and Tomorrow. London: Macmillan.
- ——— (1972). Highlights of the Book of Revelation. Nashville, TN: Broadman Press. ISBN 9780805413366. OCLC 347809.
- ——— (1974). The Book of Revelation. New Century Bible Commentary. London: Oliphants.
- ——— (1983). The Coming of God. London: Paternoster.
- ——— (1986). Jesus and the Kingdom of God. London: Paternoster.
- ——— (1991). The Gospel of Life: Theology in the Fourth Gospel. Peabody, MA: Hendrickson.
- ——— (1996). Preaching the gospel from the gospels. Peabody, MA: Hendrickson Publishers. ISBN 9781565631663. OCLC 34357303.
- ——— (1999). The Gospel of John. Word Biblical Commentary (2nd ed.). Waco, TX: Word Books.
