= Charles Bulkley =

English Baptist minister (1719–1797)

Charles Bulkley (1719–1797) was an English Baptist minister.

== Life ==
The fourth son of Thomas Bulkley, silk mercer in Ludgate Street, and Esther, fourth daughter of Matthew Henry, he was born in London 18 October 1719. His early education was under the Rev. Lancaster, a clergyman at Chester. He was trained for the ministry under Philip Doddridge, whose Northampton Academy he entered in 1736.

Bulkley's first settlement was with the Presbyterian congregation at Welford, Northamptonshire. He shortly moved on to Colchester for a while. Under the influence of John Ashworth, brother of Caleb Ashworth, he adopted the views of the General Baptists, went to London, and was immersed. Ashworth had been minister of the Baptist congregation at White's Alley, Little Moorfields; in 1743 Bulkley was the successful candidate (in competition with Richard Baron) for that post, but he again moved on to a more prominent position.

Bulkley, in 1745, succeeded James Foster at the Barbican, carrying with him his congregation from White's Alley. Some years later, when Foster retired (January 1752) from the Sunday evening lectureship at the Old Jewry Meeting-house, Bulkley again succeeded him. He came round, after Foster's death, to "mixed communion", and was taken to task for it by Grantham Killingworth, a General Baptist layman of Norwich. He is reported to have had a crowded audience at the Old Jewry for some few years.

In 1779 the General Baptist numbers in London were dropping. Bulkley's congregation associated with three others in building a small meeting-house in Worship Street, Finsbury (they moved in 1878; the congregation was at Bethnal Green at the end of the 19th century). Bulkley continued his ministry, though paralysis in 1795 broke his health and affected his speech.

Bulkley died on 15 April 1797, and was buried on 25 April in the graveyard behind the meeting-house in Worship Street.

== Works ==
Bulkley published:

- A Vindication of my Lord Shaftesbury, on the subject of Ridicule, 1751 (in reply to John Brown)
- A Vindication of my Lord Shaftesbury, on the subjects of Morality and Religion, 1752, (continuation of the preceding).
- Discourses, 1752 (fifteen in number; reissued 1760).
- Notes on the Philosophical Writings of Lord Bolingbroke. In Three Parts, 1755.
- On the Earthquake at Lisbon, 1756.
- The Nature and Necessity of National Repentance, 1756.
- Observations upon Natural Religion and Christianity 1757 (in reply to Thomas Sherlock's ' Discourses').
- The Christian Minister, 1758 (sermons).
- Sermons on Public Occasions, 1761.
- The Oeconomy of the Gospel, in Four Books, 1764 (intended as a complete body of divinity).
- Discourses on the Parables ... and the Miracles, 1770–1, 4 vols.
- Catechetical Exercises, 1774.
- Preface to Notes on the Bible, 1791,

and some sermons. Posthumously published were:

- An Apology for Human Nature, n. d. (prefatory address to William Wilberforce, by John Evans, dated 2 October 1797).
- Notes on the Bible, 1802, 3 vols. (edited, with Memoir prefixed to vol. iii., by Joshua Toulmin. The Notes are illustrative passages selected from classical, rabbinical, patristic, and later authors.

== Family ==
Bulkley married in 1749 Ann Fiske, of Colchester (died August 1783), but had no issue.

== Notes and references ==
Attribution

This article incorporates text from a publication now in the public domain: Stephen, Leslie, ed. (1886). "Bulkley, Charles". Dictionary of National Biography. Vol. 7. London: Smith, Elder & Co.
