= J. Sidlow Baxter =

Australian theologian

James Sidlow Baxter (1903 in Australia – 1999) was a pastor and theologian, and later served as an evangelist. He authored as many as thirty books (depending on how anthologies and collections of sermons are to be counted) analysing the Bible and advocating a fundamentalist Christian theological perspective. His most popular work was Explore the Book, a 1760-page tome that analyses and summarizes each book of the Bible.

Baxter was raised in Lancashire, England, and attended Spurgeon's College in London before pastoring in England and Scotland, in Northampton and Sunderland. Memories of his early campaigns in Essex in about 1926 survive in the Memories of C. Everett.

Baxter married Ethel Smith, with whom he had a daughter, Miriam. Baxter developed acute diabetes at the age of 63, which provided additional motivation for his work.
