= Spurgeon's College =

Former theological college in London

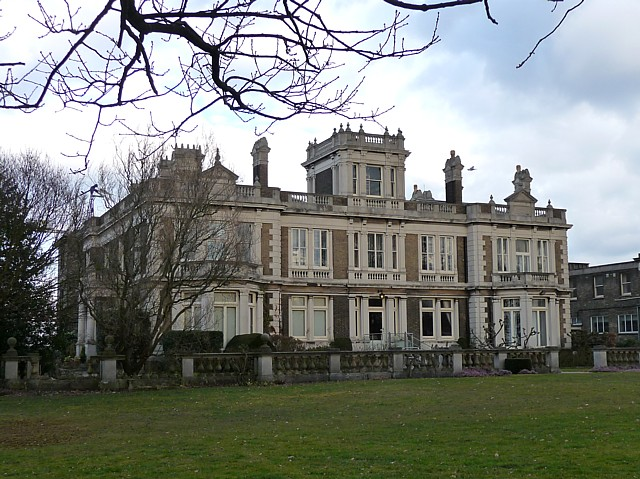
- Former name: The Pastors' College
- Established: 1856
- Religious affiliation: Baptist Union of Great Britain
- Chancellor: Rick Warren
- Principal: Philip McCormack
- Location: London, United Kingdom; 51.4064°N 0.0862°W
- Website: spurgeons.ac.uk

Spurgeon's College was an evangelical Baptist theological college in South Norwood, London, England. It was affiliated with the Baptist Union of Great Britain.

On 31 July 2025, the Trustees announced that owing to financial constraints the college would close immediately.On 6th October 2026, the building formerly used by the college was purchased by Kharis Ministries to continue the mandate began by Charles Spurgeon.

== History ==
The school was founded in 1856 by Pastor Charles Spurgeon as "Pastors' College" in London. His vision was to provide a practical theological education, mission-centered. By 1892, the school had trained 863 students. In 1923, it moved to its present building and was renamed in honor of its founder. It closed on 31 July 2025 due to financial constraints.

== Programmes ==
It delivered training for the Baptist ministry both in the UK and elsewhere. It offered a suite of other courses including online learning, a part-time (Monday) Degree course, several Master's courses. In 2008 the college was also accredited by the British Accreditation Council. In 2011 the college underwent three external inspections. A week-long inspection by the ecumenical churches (Quality in Formation) declared the college 'fit for purpose' and the University of Wales judged that the preparation for research degrees (MPhil, PhD) meets the current standards. Finally, the 2011 quinquennial review by the university resulted in a report recommending the programmes should continue subject to two conditions being met within months and other recommendations should be carefully considered.

Due to the University of Wales stopping the accreditation of outside institutes, their academic accreditation was withdrawn in 2012. In September 2012, the college announced that its degrees had received provisional accreditation by the University of Manchester, a member of the Russell Group of British universities, subject to adjustments and negotiation. In 2020 the college announced a consultation period for a redevelopment programme as part of their vision to become a university. In May 2022 the college was granted time-limited taught degree awarding powers until 2025 by the Office for Students, which were extended on 2 July 2025 until 2028. The University of Manchester and Liverpool Hope University continued to validate some courses.

On the 31 July 2025, it was announced that Higher Education courses had closed and that students would be supported in transfers. Spurgeon's also validated some courses for the Irish Baptist College, which is also affected by the closure.

== Partners ==
The school was a partner of the Baptist Union of Great Britain and the Evangelical Alliance.

== Notable alumni ==
- J. Sidlow Baxter, theologian
- George Beasley-Murray
- John Charles Carlile
- Steve Chalke, founder of Oasis Trust
- Nick Mercer, Anglican priest
- Arthur Gostick Shorrock, Baptist missionary
- Nigel G. Wright, Baptist theologian
