= Grantham Killingworth =

English lay Baptist controversialist

Grantham Killingworth (1699–1778) was an English lay Baptist controversialist.

== Life ==
A grandson of Thomas Grantham, he was born in Norwich. He was a layman, and a personal friend of William Whiston, whom he supplied with evidence of cures effected through "prayer, fasting, and annointing with oyl" by a Unitarian Baptist minister, William Barron (died 7 February 1731, aged 51).

Killingworth died in 1778, leaving an endowment to the Priory Yard General Baptist chapel, in Norwich.

== Works ==
Killingworth wrote on the perpetuity of baptism, against Thomas Emlyn; in favour of credobaptism, against John Taylor, and Michajah Towgood; and on close communion, against James Foster, John Wiche, and Charles Bulkley. His publications include:

- A Supplement to the Sermons … at Salters' Hall against Popery, 1735; 3rd ed. 1736; 5th ed. 1738, with appendices, including his answer to Emlyn's Previous Question, 1710.
- An Examination, 1741, of Foster's Discourse (1744) on "catholic communion".
- An Answer to the Defence of Dr. Foster, 1752, (the Defence was by "Philocatholicus", i.e. John Wiche).
- An Answer to Mr. Charles Bulkley's Pleas for Mixt Communion, 1756.
- A Letter … to the late … Mr. Whiston, 1757.

== Notes ==
Attribution

This article incorporates text from a publication now in the public domain: Lee, Sidney, ed. (1892). "Killingworth, Grantham". Dictionary of National Biography. Vol. 31. London: Smith, Elder & Co.
