= International Christian College =

Coordinates: 55.8640°N 4.2404°W

Bible Training Institute, established in 1892, was a bible college which aimed to evangelise the working classes in Scotland. It was closed in 2018 due to financial deficit.

== History ==
The foundation of the Bible Training Institute, originally located in Bothwell Street, Glasgow, Scotland, can be traced to visits to Glasgow between 1874 and 1891 by the American revivalists Dwight Lyman Moody and Ira D. Sankey, and was one of several Christian initiatives in the city that owed their origins to their work - including the Tent Hall and various other missions that had a special appeal to the working classes of the day, who often felt uncomfortable mixing with the more middle class congregations of established churches.

The Bible Training Institute was opened in 1892 and from 1898 was located in or alongside the Christian Institute building, which also housed the YMCA. In 1980 it moved to a former Church of Scotland building in the fashionable west end of the city, at the corner of Byres Road and Great Western Road and in 1990 it became known as Glasgow Bible College. Facilities here were more extensive than previous buildings, but the college soon outgrew them and relocated to an even larger property in St James Road, in what was previously a college of nursing and midwifery adjacent to Strathclyde University. This coincided with the change of name to International Christian College in Glasgow, Scotland, which was formed in 1998 as the result of a merger between Glasgow Bible College (formerly the Bible Training Institute) and Northumbria Bible College (formerly Lebanon Missionary Bible College).

In 2013 the college announced the sale of this building and its intention to move to a new location. Following further review, in 2014 it was announced that following prolonged and substantial falls in new student intakes and unsuccessful attempts to cut costs and to reverse these falls, the college would close in its existing form and explore options for a different kind of future. The combination of free student tuition funding at universities in Scotland and very limited tuition funding for Scottish students at ICC, along with independent colleges in the rest of the UK and Ireland now being able to offer full student loan funding to students were the most significant factors in the college's predicament and this decision.

In 2015, the college was relaunched as Scottish School of Christian Mission. In partnership with Nazarene Theological College, it was able to offer full student funding for degrees validated by the University of Manchester. It was also an SQA-accredited centre. It offered a BA(Hons) in Theology (Youth and Community), a Certificate in Theology (Pioneer Ministry), an MA in Theology (Urban Mission) and an MA in Theology (Transforming Leadership). A variety of SQA-accredited qualifications were also offered.

The college also moved its premises to Parkhead, Glasgow, in 2015, to reflects its historical and contemporary focus on urban mission.

== Closure ==
In June 2018 the Board of Directors announced that the college was closing as of 30 June 2018. Nazarene Theological College kept on some of the staff and took over full responsibility for the students. The heritage that started with BTI back in 1892 will continue while the effect of all the students that have been taught lives, but the college itself has closed. Nazarene Theological College holds the academic records for ICCC, Northumbria Bible College, and Lebanon Missionary Bible College. Its Grogan Library was donated to NTC's Glasgow campus after its closure.

== Principals ==
=== Bible Training Institute (1892–1990) ===
- John Anderson (1898-1913)
- David McIntyre (1913-1938)
- Francis Davidson (1938-1954) had been invited by McIntyre as a visiting lecturer in Biblical and Systematic Theology some 5 years before he succeeded him as principal. He was also Professor of Biblical Criticism in the United Original Secession Church of Scotland.
- Andrew MacBeath (1954-1969)
- Geoffrey Watts Grogan (1969–1991)

=== Glasgow Bible College (1990–1998) ===
- C Peter White (until 1996)
- Alexander McIntosh (acting principal until 1998)

=== Northumbria Bible College (−1998) ===
- D W Lambert (1946 - 1967) as Lebanon Missionary Bible College
- David J Rigby (1968 - 1984) as Lebanon Missionary Bible College

Rev Frank Snow (1984 - 1990)

- David W Smith (1990 - 1998) (who was later on ICC teaching staff)

=== International Christian College (1998-2015) ===
- Tony Sargent (1998–2009)
- Richard Tiplady (2010-2015)

=== Scottish School of Christian Mission (2015-2018) ===
- Richard Tiplady (2015-2017)

== Bibliography ==
- Grogan, Geoffrey W (1993). "Bible Training Institute, Glasgow". In Cameron, Nigel M de S (ed.). Dictionary of Scottish Church History & Theology. Edinburgh: T & T Clark. ISBN 0-567-09650-5.
