= John Evans (Baptist) =

Welsh Baptist minister

John Evans (2 October 1767 – 25 January 1827) was a Welsh Baptist minister.

== Life ==
He was born at Usk in Monmouthshire, 2 October 1767. After schooling in Bristol he became a student in November 1783 in the Baptist academy there, where his relative Dr. Caleb Evans was theological tutor. During part of the time Robert Hall was his classical tutor. In 1787 he matriculated at King's College, Aberdeen, and went in 1790 to the University of Edinburgh. Having taken the degree of M.A. he returned in June 1791 to England.

In that year Evans year accepted an invitation from the morning congregation of General Baptists in Worship Street, London, where, after officiating a few months, he was chosen pastor and ordained 31 May 1792. He was there for 35 years. Two years later he opened a school, first at Hoxton Square and subsequently at 7 Pullin's Row, Islington, which he taught with success for about thirty years. In 1803 he was elected a Fellow of the Society of Antiquaries; he withdrew in 1825.

In 1815 he began to lose the use of his limbs. In 1819 he received the degree of LL.D. from Brown University, Rhode Island, and in the same year he issued his ‘Memoirs of the Life and Writings of the Rev. William Richards, LL.D., of Lynn … with some account of the Rev. Roger Williams, founder of the State of Rhode Island,’ London, 1819. In 1825 he resigned his school, having 6 December 1821 lost his third son, Caleb, who had been his intended successor. Although he needed to be carried to the pulpit, he continued to preach until a few weeks before his death at Islington, aged 59.

A portrait of Evans, by Woodman, accompanies his ‘Tracts, Sermons, and Funeral Orations, published between 1795 and 1825, and six new Discourses,’ London, 1826.

== Works ==
Immediately on his assuming the office of pastor Evans published An Address humbly designed to promote the Revival of Religion, more especially among the General Baptists, London, 1793. Evans's writings in the end amounted to some forty in number: sermons, tracts, prefaces, biographical and topographical notices, and schoolbooks.

The Sketch of the Denominations of the Christian World first appeared in the beginning of 1795 in the form of a shilling pamphlet, London. Its rapid sale called for a second edition in July of the same year, and during a period of about thirty years, fourteen successive editions were circulated; a fifteenth edition had been completed by the author immediately before his last illness. The book was translated into Welsh, Merthyr Tydfil, 1808, and into various European languages, while several editions were issued in America, the first having appeared at Boston, 1807. In his dedication of the fourteenth edition to Lord Erskine, Evans stated that although a hundred thousand copies had then been sold, he had parted with the copyright for £10, but he consoled himself by reflecting that the popularity of the book was due to its impartiality. A sequel to the Sketch was A Preservative against the Infidelity and Uncharitableness of the Eighteenth Century; or, Testimonies in behalf of Christian Candour and Unanimity, by Divines of the Church of England, of the Kirk of Scotland, and among the Protestant Dissenters (an essay on the right of private judgment prefixed), 1796; 3rd edit., The Golden Centenary, London, 1806.

Other works are:

- An Attempt to account for the Infidelity of the late Mr. Gibbon, founded on his own Memoirs. … Including an Account of the Conversion and Death of the Right Hon. George, Lord Lyttelton, London [1797].
- An Essay on the Education of Youth, London, 1798; 2nd edit., London [1799].
- The Juvenile Tourist; or, Excursions through various parts of Great Britain, illustrated with Maps, … In a series of Letters, London, 1804.
- Picture of Worthing, 1805; 2nd edit., 2 vols., Worthing, 1814.
- General Redemption the only proper Basis of General Benevolence; a Letter to Robert Hawker, D.D., London, 1809; 2nd edit., with animadversions on the "Eclectic Review", London [1809].
- Complete Religious Liberty Vindicated; on the petition for the abolition of all penal statutes of the dissenting ministers of London and Westminster, 2 Feb. 1813, London, 1813; 2nd edit. in the same year.
- An Excursion to Windsor; to which is added, A Journal of a Trip to Paris, by his son, John Evans, jun., M.A., London.
- The Christianity of the New Testament Impregnable and Imperishable; an Address occasioned by the trial of R. Carlile, London, 1819. On Richard Carlile.
- Recreation for the Young and Old. An Excursion to Brighton, … a Visit to Tunbridge Wells, and a Trip to Southend. In a series of Letters, Chiswick, 1821.
- Richmond and its Vicinity; with a Glance at Twickenham, Strawberry Hill, and Hampton Court, Richmond, 1824; 2nd edit. Richmond, 1825.

== Family ==
In August 1795 he married Mary, daughter of John Wiche, for nearly half a century General Baptist minister at Maidstone. Three sons survived him. John Evans, the son, graduated M.A. at Edinburgh, and wrote besides the Journal (see above) papers in the Philosophical Magazine on guiding balloons through the atmosphere (xlvi. 321–7), on aerial navigation (xlvii. 429–31), and on a method of naming roots of cubes under ten figures (li. 443–4).
