= Grady Nutt =

American actor (1934–1982)

- Born: Grady Lee Nutt; September 2, 1934; Amarillo, Texas, U.S.
- Died: November 23, 1982 (aged 48); Vinemont, Alabama, U.S.
- Spouse: Eleanor Wilson (1957-1982; by his death)

Comedy career
- Medium: Television; Recordings; Books; Speaking engagements
- Subject: Christian comedy

Grady Lee Nutt (September 2, 1934 – November 23, 1982) was a Southern Baptist minister, humorist, television personality, and author. His humor revolved around rural Southern Protestantism and earned him the title of "The Prime Minister of Humor".

== Childhood and early career ==
Grady Lee Nutt was born in Amarillo, Texas, the oldest of four children (three sons and a daughter) born to Grady C. and Doris (née Rickman) Nutt. Reared in a family of devout Baptists, Nutt was a licensed minister by the age of 13. He was an uncle to actress, director Joey Lauren Adams.

Nutt briefly attended Wayland Baptist College in Plainview, Texas, before transferring to Baylor University. Immediately after graduation, he married Eleanor Wilson and served as youth minister of the First Baptist Church of Waco and later at Gaston Avenue Baptist Church in Dallas.

In 1960, he moved to Louisville, Kentucky, to attend the Southern Baptist Theological Seminary, where he simultaneously pastored churches in the Louisville metro area. Following his graduation in 1964, he served as director of alumni affairs and assistant to the president of Southern Seminary.

== Entertainment career ==
While serving as a minister and seminary administrator, Nutt began accepting speaking engagements. His speeches were blended with humor, and he came to the attention of Ralph Edwards, the producer of the popular TV series Truth or Consequences and This Is Your Life. He was soon a semi-regular on The Mike Douglas Show.

In 1979, he was added to the regular cast of Hee Haw, a position he held until his death. On Hee Haw, he was given 90 – 120 seconds in which he would do an improvised routine.

In 1981, he was cast as Rev. Grady Williams in a pilot for an NBC sitcom called The Grady Nutt Show. The episode dealt with Rev. Williams being called to preach the funeral of a man disliked by the entire community, and dealing with his teenage daughter's foray into dating. The 30-minute pilot was broadcast on NBC, but had not been put into production as a series at the time of his death.

During his career, he published several books, including The Gospel According to Norton and an autobiography entitled So Good, So Far; he also released several comedic records and one Southern Gospel album, Give the World A Smile.

== Death and legacy ==
On November 23, 1982, following a speaking engagement in Cullman, Alabama, Nutt boarded a chartered flight (a Beechcraft Baron 55, aircraft registration number N18411). The plane crashed immediately after takeoff, killing Nutt, the pilot and the co-pilot. The cause of the crash was undetermined, although weather conditions (fog and rain) were cited as contributing factors in the accident. He was buried on the Wilson family farm in Fayette County, Tennessee.

Following his death, the Gospel Music Association established the Grady Nutt Humor award to excellence in Christian comedy.

His widow has established the Grady Nutt Endowment Fund at the University of Louisville, which offers an annual prize of $400 to the most creative fine arts project and a Grady Nutt memorial collection was established in the student center at the Southern Baptist Theological Seminary in Louisville.

Alice Lloyd College in Pippa Passes, Kentucky, named the Grady Nutt Athletic Center in his honor.
