= Ernest Alexander Payne =

British Baptist administrator and scholar

Ernest Payne
- Ernest Payne
- Born: 19 February 1902
- Died: 14 February 1980 (aged 77)

Academic background
- Education: Mansfield College, Oxford

Ernest Alexander Payne CH (19 February 1902 – 14 January 1980) was a British Baptist theologian and historian. He was a senior tutor at Regent's Park College, Oxford. He served the British Baptist Union as a pastor, teacher and writer before becoming its general secretary and president. A dedicated ecumenist, he held high office in the Free Churches, the British Council of Churches and the World Council of Churches, where he was elected president. In recognition of his ecumenical work, he was created a Member of the Order of the Companions of Honour.

== Biography ==
M. S. West, To be a pilgrim: a memoir of Ernest A. Payne, Lutterworth Press, 1983 ISBN 0-7188-2559-4 ISBN 9780718825591

== Selected works ==
- A 20th century minister: John Oliver Barrett, 1901–78. (1979)
- The Anabaptists of the 16th century and their influence in the modern world. (1949)
- The Baptist Union: a short history. (1982)
- Baptists and church relations. (1964)
- The Baptists of the world and their overseas missions. (1955)
- The excellent Mr. Burls: first London member of the committee and third treasurer of the Baptist Missionary Society; first treasurer of the Baptist Irish Society. (1943)
- The fellowship of believers: Baptist thought and practice yesterday and today. (1952)
- The first generation. Early leaders of the Baptist Missionary Society in England and India. (1937)
- The Free Church tradition in the life of England. (1951)
- The Great succession: leaders of the Baptist Missionary Society during the nineteenth century. (1946)
- The growth of the world church: the story of the modern missionary movement (1955)
- Harry Wyatt of Shansi, 1895–1938. (1939)
- James Henry Rushbrooke, 1870–1947: a Baptist greatheart. (1954)
- Marianne Lewis and Elizabeth Sale: pioneers of missionary work among women. (1937)
- Out of great tribulation: Baptists in the U.S.S.R. (1974)
- Philip Doddridge, 1702–51: his contribution to English religion. (1951)
- The story of the Baptists. (1978)
- Thirty years of the British Council of Churches, 1942–1972. (1972)
- Thomas Helwys and the first Baptist Church in England. (1966)
- Veteran warrior: a memoir of B. Grey Griffith. (1962)
