= Andrew MacBeath =

Andrew G. W. MacBeath was a Scottish preacher associated with the Keswick Convention. He was the younger brother of John MacBeath. He studied at the University of Edinburgh, the Baptist College in Glasgow, and New College, Edinburgh.

MacBeath spent 15 years with the Baptist Missionary Society in Congo. During World War II, he spent 6 years in Cape Town, and then was a lecturer on the Bible at Toronto Bible College for four years. In 1954, he spent three months in West Africa, and in the summer of 1967, re-visited Congo. He then went on to African Great Lakes countries.

In the 1950s and 1960s, MacBeath was at the Bible Training Institute, Glasgow.

He took part in the funeral of his brother in May 1967 by which time he was no longer principal of the Bible Training Institute. As a student at the Bible Training Institute in Bothwell St. Glasgow during the years 1967–1969 the Principal for those two years was Andrew Macbeath.

== Published works (selected) ==
- W. H. Aldis (1949), biography of W. H. Aldis
- The Book of Job: A Study Manual (1966)
