= John G. Burkhalter =

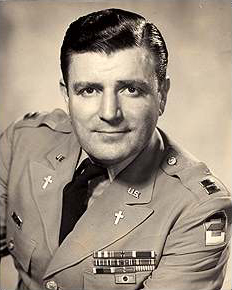
- Born: July 23, 1909; Thomasville, Georgia
- Died: September 30, 1992 (aged 83); Washington, DC
- Burial place: Arlington National Cemetery
- Education: University of Miami
- Military career
- Allegiance: United States of America
- Branch: United States Army United States Army Reserve
- Service years: 1942 - 1969
- Rank: Lieutenant Colonel
- Conflicts: World War II; D-Day; Battle of the Bulge; Korean War
- Awards: Silver Star; Bronze Star; Purple Heart; Presidential Unit Citation; Army of Occupation Medal; National Defense Service Medal; Korean Service Medal; Armed Forces Reserve Medal; United Nations Korea Medal

Rev. John Grady Burkhalter (July 23, 1909 – September 30, 1992) was a Baptist minister and highly decorated chaplain who served in World War II and the Korean War. He was part of the D-Day invasion of Normandy at Omaha Beach.

== Early days ==
Burkhalter was born in Thomasville, Georgia, on July 23, 1909. While an adolescent, he boxed professionally under the name "Jacky Mills," and played on the 1929 Miami High School football team. In 1935, Burkhalter was named senior pastor of the West Flagler Park Baptist Church in Miami, Florida, and married his high school sweetheart, Miss Mabel Money, the following year.

== Military career ==
=== World War II ===
Burkhalter enlisted in the United States Army and graduated from the Chaplain's School at Harvard. In 1943, he was assigned to the 1st Infantry Division and landed on Omaha Beach on D-day. An account of his experiences was printed in the Miami Daily News on August 6, 1944. Rev Burkhalter sustained multiple head injuries due to exploding shrapnel during the Battle of the Bulge. He was declared "missing in action" for several weeks before eventually turning up in a French hospital. Burkhalter received a Purple Heart for these deeds. Burkhalter was awarded the Bronze Star for valor and America's third highest honor, The Silver Star for gallantry. His citation for the Silver Star reads as follows: "For gallantry in action in the vicinity of Haaren, Germany, 21 October 1944. Although constantly subjected to heavy artillery bombardment and several times thrown to the ground by concussion of exploding shells, Chaplain Burkhalter moved about an exposed area and directed the recovery of the bodies of American casualties. Chaplain Burkhalter's courage and coolness under fire were of great inspiration to all who witnessed his gallant deeds."

=== Korean War ===
Burkhalter also spent time with the 2nd Infantry Division and would spend a total of 20 months in the European Theater of Operations. On March 22, 1946, Burkhalter was promoted to the rank of captain and was assigned to an occupational duty in Japan. He stayed in Japan several years until the Korean War escalated. During the Korean War, he served primarily with the 51st Signal Battalion and the 73rd Tank Battalion. While serving near Kumch'on in the summer of 1950, Rev. Burkhalter gained notoriety when his name and a photograph of him conducting a funeral were published in Life Magazine. Burkhalter was promoted to major during the Korean War and would spend thirteen months in Korea. After the war, Burkhalter would serve in several different posts and entered the US Army Reserves. On July 3, 1969, Burkhalter officially retired from the United States Army as a lieutenant colonel. Some of Burkhalter's military adventures were recorded in 2000 in the book, "Heroes to Remember" by Brandon R. Sanders.

=== U.S. decorations and badges ===
U.S. military decorations
Silver Star
Bronze Star
Purple Heart
Republic of Korea Presidential Unit Citation
Army of Occupation Medal
National Defense Service Medal
Korean Service Medal
Armed Forces Reserve Medal
United Nations Korea Medal

== Education and pastoral ministry ==
Burkhalter held bachelor's degrees in history from the University of Miami and divinity from Crozer Theological Seminary in Pennsylvania. Burkhalter held a master's degree in history from Stetson University and began doctoral work at American University. He pastored several churches including West Flagler Park Baptist Church in Miami, Van Buren Street Baptist Church in Eastport (1959–1963), Berkley Baptist Church in Mount Royal, N.J. (1963–1967) and Maryland City Baptist Church in Laurel (1967–1968). He founded Temple Baptist Church (renamed Riva Community Bible Church) in Riva, Md. in 1973, and served as pastor there until 1988.

== Death and burial ==
Burkhalter died on September 30, 1992, at the age of 83 and was buried with full military honors on Chaplain's Hill at Arlington National Cemetery. The burial was carried out by the 3rd US Infantry Regiment (The Old Guard) and included a military band, American flag draped over the coffin, horse-drawn wagon, 21-gun salute, taps, Riderless horse, etc.

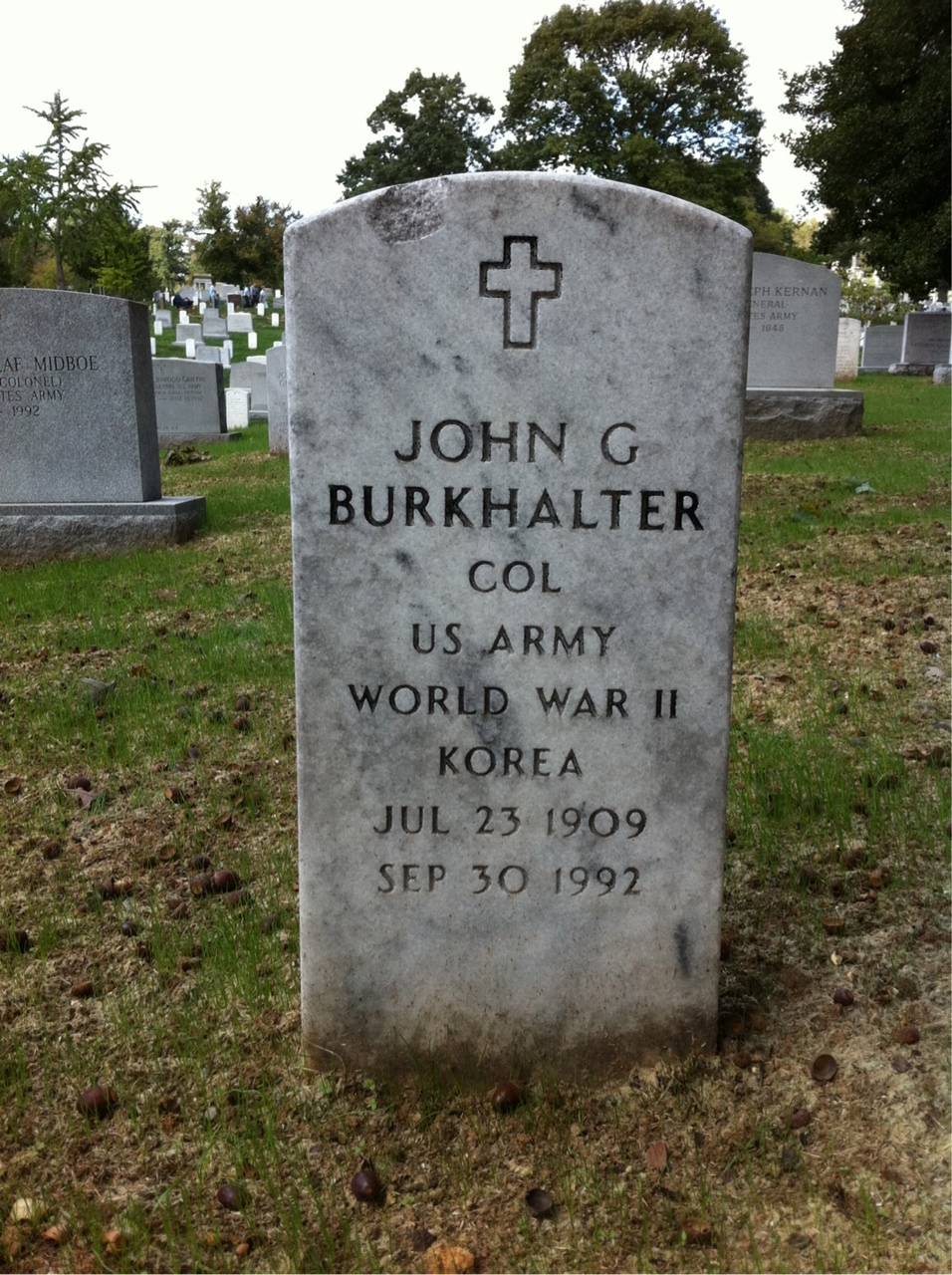
Burkhalter's grave, Arlington National Cemetery
