= Nigel G. Wright =

British Baptist theologian (born 1949)

The Reverend Dr Nigel G. Wright FRSA FRHistS FHEA
- Born: 13 May 1949 (age 77); Manchester, England

Ecclesiastical career
- Religion: Christianity (Baptist)
- Church: Baptist Union of Great Britain
- Ordained: c. 1971

Academic background
- Education: University of Leeds; University of London University of Glasgow; King's College, London; Spurgeon's College
- Doctoral advisor: Colin Gunton

Academic work
- Discipline: Theology
- Institutions: Spurgeon's College

Nigel Goring Wright FRSA FRHistS FHEA (born 1949) is a British Baptist theologian.

== Early life and education ==
Wright was born on 13 May 1949 in Manchester and joined the Baptist church at the age of fifteen. He attended the University of Leeds, graduating in 1970 with a Bachelor of Arts degree in modern languages. He further gaining a BD degree from the University of London. He earned a Master of Theology degree from the University of Glasgow in 1987 and a Doctor of Philosophy in 1994 from King's College, London.

== Career in the Baptist church ==
Wright trained for the ministry at Spurgeon's College in London and served as a Baptist minister at Ansdell in Lytham St Annes on Lancashire's Fylde coast from 1973 to 1986, then as a tutor at Spurgeon's College, again as a local minister in Altrincham, and became principal of Spurgeon's College in 2000. He was elected President of the Baptist Union of Great Britain in 2002 and retired in 2013. He is married to Judy, has two children and now lives in Cheshire.

== Author and theologian ==
Wright has written a number of books and essays on various Baptist theological topics. His views are summarized in Free Church, Free State: The Positive Baptist Vision, published by Paternoster in 2005. His writings have been widely cited and discussed by other theologians. Wright identifies with a "radical evangelicalism," a "development from" conservative evangelicalism: it is "prepared to decide issues concerning the form of scripture on their relative merits [...] It is not inherently suspicious of 'higher criticism' [..] not wedded to the 'conservative' assumptions of much recent evangelicalism."

Wright is also a frequent speaker and presenter about Baptist theological renewal.

In 2009, at the age of 60, he was honoured by a festschrift: Lalleman, Pieter J. (ed.), Challenging to Change: Dialogues with a Radical Baptist Theologian: Essays Presented to Dr. Nigel G. Wright on His Sixtieth Birthday. London: Spurgeon's College, 2009. ISBN 9780950068237

== Publications ==
The Radical Kingdom: Restoration in Theory and Practice. Eastbourne: Kingsway, 1986.

The Fair Face of Evil: Putting the Power of Darkness in Its Place. London: Marshall Pickering, 1989. American title: The Satan Syndrome: Putting the Power of Darkness in Its Place. Grand Rapids: Zondervan, 1990.

Lord and Giver of Life: An Introduction to the Person and Work of the Holy Spirit. Illustrated by June Gascoigne. The Baptist Union of Great Britain, 1990.

Challenge to Change: A Radical Agenda for Baptists. Foreword by David Coffey. Eastbourne: Kingsway, 1991.

Charismatic Renewal: The Search for a Theology. With Tom Smail and Andrew Walker. London: SPCK, 1993. And as: The Love of Power and the Power of Love: A Careful Assessment of the Problems Within the Charismatic and Word-of-Faith Movements. Minneapolis: Bethany House, 1994.

The Radical Evangelical: Seeking a Place to Stand. London: SPCK, 1996. Wipf and Stock, 2016.

Power and Discipleship: Towards a Baptist Theology of the State. The Whitley Lecture for 1996-97. Oxford: Whitley Publications, 1996.

Disavowing Constantine: Mission, Church and the Social Order in the Theologies of Jurgen Moltmann and John Howard Yoder. Carlisle: Paternoster, 2000. Wipf and Stock, 2007.

New Baptists, New Agenda. Paternoster, 2002.

A Theology of the Dark Side: Putting the Power of Evil in Its Place. Carlisle: Paternoster, 2003. A “reworked and rewritten” version of The Fair Face of Evil/The Satan Syndrome.

Free Church, Free State: The Positive Baptist Vision. Foreword by Denton Lotz. Milton Keynes, UK: Paternoster, 2005. Also: Wipf and Stock, 2011.

God on the Inside: The Holy Spirit in Holy Scripture. Oxford: Bible Reading Fellowship, 2006.

Baptist Basics. 12 vols. Didcot: Baptist Union of Great Britain, 2009.

The Real Godsend. 2009.

Jesus Christ - The Alpha and the Omega: Bible Readings and Reflections for Lent and Easter. The Bible Reading Fellowship, 2010.

Vital Truth: The Convictions of the Christian Community. Eugene: Oregon: Cascade, 2016.

How to Be a Church Minister. Wipf and Stock, 2018.

Editor

Truth That Never Dies: The Dr. G. R. Beasley-Murray Memorial Lectures 2002-2012. Wipf and Stock, 2014.
