= Arnesby =

Village in Leicestershire, England

Coordinates: 52.5244°N 1.0919°W

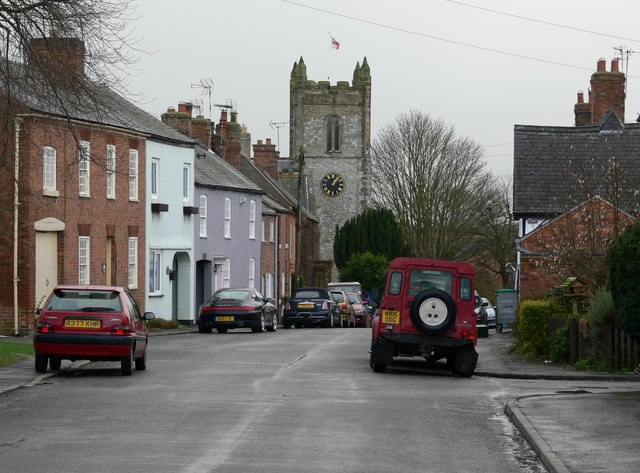
- Arnesby

- Location within Leicestershire
- Population: 357
- OS grid reference: SP616922
- District: Harborough
- Shire county: Leicestershire
- Region: East Midlands
- Country: England
- Sovereign state: United Kingdom
- Post town: Leicester
- Postcode district: LE8
- Dialling code: 0116
- Police: Leicestershire
- Fire: Leicestershire
- Ambulance: East Midlands
- UK Parliament: Blaby

Arnesby is a village and civil parish in the Harborough district of Leicestershire, England. Arnesby contains approximately 142 households with a population of about 357 (2011 census). The village is situated 8 miles (13 km) south-east of Leicester, on the Welford Road, between Kilby and Shearsby.

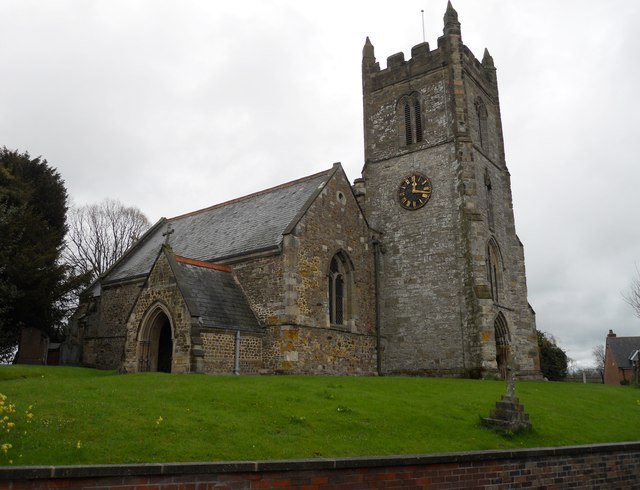
St Peter's Church, Arnesby

St Peter's Church, Arnesby dates from the early 12th century. The village also has a Baptist church which dates from the early 18th century. The Rev. Robert Hall was born at Arnesby in 1764 and lived at the Old Manse next door to the chapel where his father, Robert Hall, was pastor of the Baptist congregation. There is a Church of England primary school, a village hall and, since 2004, an Indian restaurant 'Little India' in a building formerly occupied by the Olde Cock Inn. Also in the area is a tank hangar which houses a large private collection of armoured fighting vehicles and artillery.

== Name ==
The village's name means 'farm/settlement of Iarund or Erendi'.

== Landmarks ==
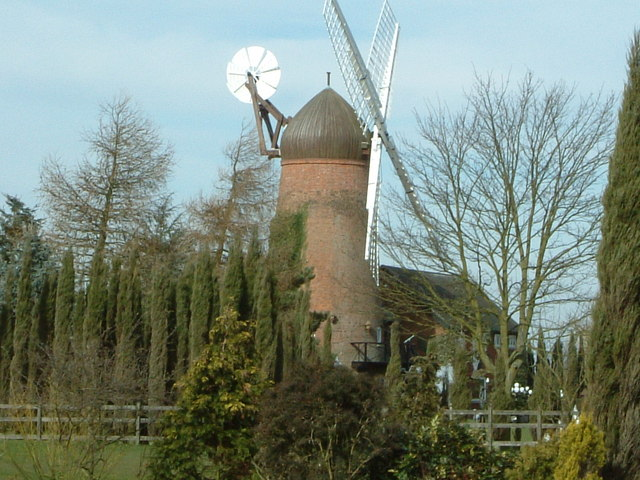
Arnesby windmill

One of the most visible landmarks of the village is the Grade II listed village windmill. Built in 1815, and extensively restored in 1976, the windmill can be seen from miles around. In total, there are 15 Grade II listed structures in Arnesby: the windmill, a Baptist chapel, a milepost, memorial, a cross base in St Peter's Church grounds and 10 houses. The Church of St. Peter is a Grade II* listed building.

== Culture and events ==
The village holds a May Fayre, on the second bank holiday each May. It pulls in crowds from miles around, and in addition to the atmosphere of the day attractions include games, competitions, craft stalls and street entertainment (brass band and a selection of local rock bands). The fayre raises money for local amenities. Past contributions have gone towards work on the roof of the Norman church and to providing disabled access to the village hall. The day is well supported by village volunteers. The local school also regularly likes to put on a maypole dance.

== Sport ==
Arnesby Cricket Club: It is not known when Arnesby first took to the field, but Arnesby is identified as a participant in the "Leicester Challenge Cup" cricket competition in 1888 and 1889. Arnesby later went on to achieve considerable success in the "Lutterworth & District Village Cricket Challenge Cup", winning the Challenge Cup on three occasions (1907, 1911, and 1934). Today, Arnesby is a non league playing club that fields an occasional Sunday friendly XI side against neighbouring village teams in and around the district.

Arnesby Table Tennis Club is based in the Village Hall. Arnesby I & II compete in the Leicester Table Tennis League.

Arnesby Golf Society is an informal Society for golfers of all abilities.

== Notable residents ==
- Robert Hall 1764–1831, born in Arnesby, Baptist minister and preacher, advocated freedom of the press.
