= William Lockhart (cricketer) =

Scottish cricketer and preacher

Personal information
- Full name: William Peddie Lockhart
- Born: 15 October 1835; Kirkcaldy, Fife, Scotland
- Died: 12 August 1893 (aged 57); Ballater, Aberdeenshire, Scotland
- Batting: Unknown
- Role: Wicket-keeper

Career statistics
Competition	First-class
Matches	7
Runs scored	65
Batting average	5.00
100s/50s	–/–
Top score	17
Catches/stumpings	8/8
- Source: Cricinfo, 12 September 2019

William Peddie Lockhart (15 October 1835 – 12 August 1893) was a Scottish first-class cricketer and Baptist preacher.

Lockhart was born at Kirkcaldy in October 1835. Both of his grandfathers were Baptist preachers and he decided to become a Christian when he was 20 years old.

The family moved to Liverpool when he was twelve years old. Lockhart worked was a merchant. He began his evangelical baptism in Liverpool at Hope Hall, which he rented on a weekly basis.

== Cricket career ==
Lockhart was regarded as one of the finest wicket-keepers of the North of England, he played his club cricket for Liverpool Cricket Club in the 1850s. He made his debut in first-class cricket for the North in the North v South fixture of 1857 at Nottingham. He made two first-class appearances in 1858 for the Gentlemen of the North against the Gentlemen of the South, before appearing twice for the Gentlemen of the North versus the Gentlemen of the South in 1859, in addition to playing for the Gentlemen in the Gentlemen v Players fixture. His final first-class appearance came for Another England Eleven against the England Eleven to North America in 1859 at Manchester. In seven first-class matches, he scored 65 runs and behind the stumps he took 8 catches and made 8 stumpings.

== Preaching career ==
Long after his first-class cricket career had finished, Lockhart was still a merchant preacher in Liverpool. Having outgrown Hope Hall, he moved to Hengler's Circus, where he welcomed the American evangelist Dwight L. Moody in 1867. Lockhart raised £7,000 in 1870 for the construction of Toxteth Baptist Tabernacle, opened by Charles Spurgeon in 1871. His mission was to convert the urban poor, but a critic of Lockhart's noted that his congregations mostly composed 'smug shopkeepers'. However, by 1886 his sermons were attracting roughly 1,500 people.

In 1875 he published a book called Backsliding.

== Family ==
In 1866 he married Mary Jane Freeman.

He returned to Scotland in the 1890s, where he died in August 1893 at Ballater, Aberdeenshire. Spurgeon spoke at his memorial service.
