= Baptists Together =

British Baptist denomination

Baptists Together (Baptist Union of Great Britain)
- Classification: Protestant
- Orientation: Baptist
- Scripture: Protestant Bible
- Polity: Congregationalist
- President: Alex Afriye
- Vice-president: Mark Elder
- Distinct fellowships: Old Baptist Union, Baptist Union of Wales, New Connexion of General Baptists
- Associations: World Council of Churches, Baptist World Alliance, Conference of European Churches, European Baptist Federation, Churches Together in Britain and Ireland, Fellowship of British Baptists, Churches Together in England
- Region: England and Wales
- Headquarters: Didcot
- Founder: John Rippon and Joseph Ivimey
- Origin: 1813 (or 1770
- Separations: Grace Baptist Assembly, Association of Grace Baptist Churches, Seventh Day Baptists, Strict Baptists, Gospel Standard Baptists
- Congregations: 1,822
- Members: 99,121
- Missionary organization: BMS World Mission
- Aid organization: Baptist Aid; Orphan Society; Annuity Fund
- Tertiary institutions: 1
- Seminaries: 4
- Official website: baptist.org.uk

Baptists Together, formally the Baptist Union of Great Britain, is a Baptist Christian denomination in England and Wales. It is affiliated with the Baptist World Alliance and Churches Together in England. The headquarters is in Didcot.

== History ==
The Baptist Union of Great Britain was officially established in 1813 by 45 Particular Baptist churches in London. In 1832, it was reorganized to include the New Connexion of General Baptists (General Baptist) as partner. In 1891, General Baptist and Particular Baptist work merged in the Baptist Union of Great Britain, and The Baptist Historical Society was created in 1908.

In 1922, Edith Gates became the first ordained female cleric in the BUGB.

In 1978, Nell Alexander became the first woman to be appointed as BUGB President.

In 1987, Margaret Jarman became the first woman minister to be appointed president of the BUGB.

In 1999 Cham Kaur-Mann became the first Asian woman minister in the BUGB.

In 2013 Lynn Green was elected, with no votes against, as the first female General Secretary of the Baptist Union of Great Britain to commence in September 2013. She was received at the vote by a standing ovation and her inaugural message included "I believe that our union is ready for generational change... It is time to cast off the institutional mindset that has served us well in the past, and embrace a new way of being for the 21st century."

Also in 2013, the union publicly re-branded itself as "Baptists Together" and introduced a new logo to reflect the change (although it is still known in an official capacity as the Baptist Union of Great Britain).

In 2006, Revd Dr Kate Coleman from Ghana, the first black woman to be an accredited Baptist minister, became the first black female President of the BUGB.

== Membership ==
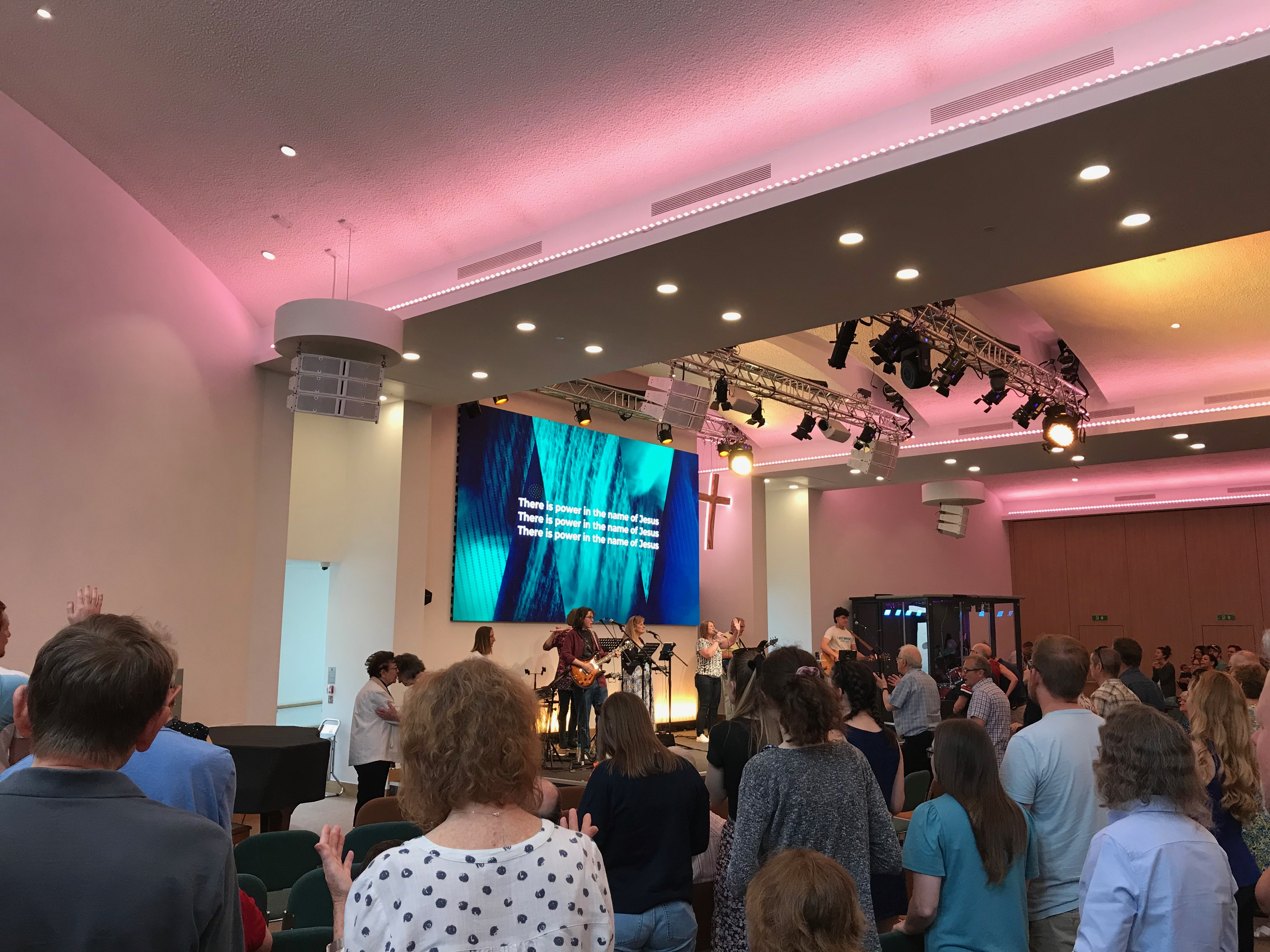
Worship service at Gold Hill Baptist Church, near London.

According to a census published by the union in 2025, it claimed 1,822 churches and 99,121 members.

=== Missionary organization ===
The Fellowship of British Baptists and BMS World Mission brings together in ministry the churches that are members of the Baptist Union of Scotland, Wales, the Irish Baptist Networks, and the Baptist Union of Great Britain. It is itself a member of the National Council for Voluntary Youth Services (NCVYS) because of its work to promote young people's personal and social development.

=== Inter-denominational associations ===
The union maintains membership with Christian ecumenical organisations such as Churches Together in England, Churches Together in Britain and Ireland, the Conference of European Churches, and the World Council of Churches.

== Missionary society ==
The BMS World Mission was organised as Baptist Missionary Society in 1792, under the leadership of Andrew Fuller (1754–1815), John Sutcliff (1752–1814), and William Carey (1761–1834).

== Beliefs ==
The union has a Baptist confession of faith. It is a member of the Baptist World Alliance.

=== Marriage ===
In 1988, the union adopted a resolution affirming that homosexuality is unacceptable in the ministry.

In 2000, progressive churches founded the Affirm network for the inclusion of LGBTQ people.

In 2014, the union affirmed the freedom of each local church about blessings of same-sex marriage. Due to opposition from conservatives, it advised against doing so in May 2016. In December 2016, a group of pastors called on the union to respect diversity of belief, as it does with the ordination of women.

In 2020, the Ministerial Recognition Committee received a letter from 70 members of the union asking that the rules be changed to allow ministers in same-sex marriages to no longer be guilty of gross misconduct. The request was referred to the national Council, who discussed it in March 2022 and initiated a process of consultation whereby ministers and churches in membership with the union were asked their thoughts on the proposed change. During this time a group formed, initially known as 'Baptist Ministers for Orthodox Marriage' and later 'Evangelical Baptists', who campaigned against the change in rules. The results of the consultation were presented to Council, who decided against the change in March 2024 with a vote of 65% against:

Council has concluded that our Ministerial Recognition Rules concerning marriage and ministry will remain unchanged. Therefore, an accredited minister should not themselves be in a same-sex marriage. Nonetheless Council reiterates that sexual orientation is no bar to accreditation. Furthermore, Council upholds the liberty of the local church to appoint ministry according to their governing documents.

— Baptist Union Council, 2024,

== Schools ==
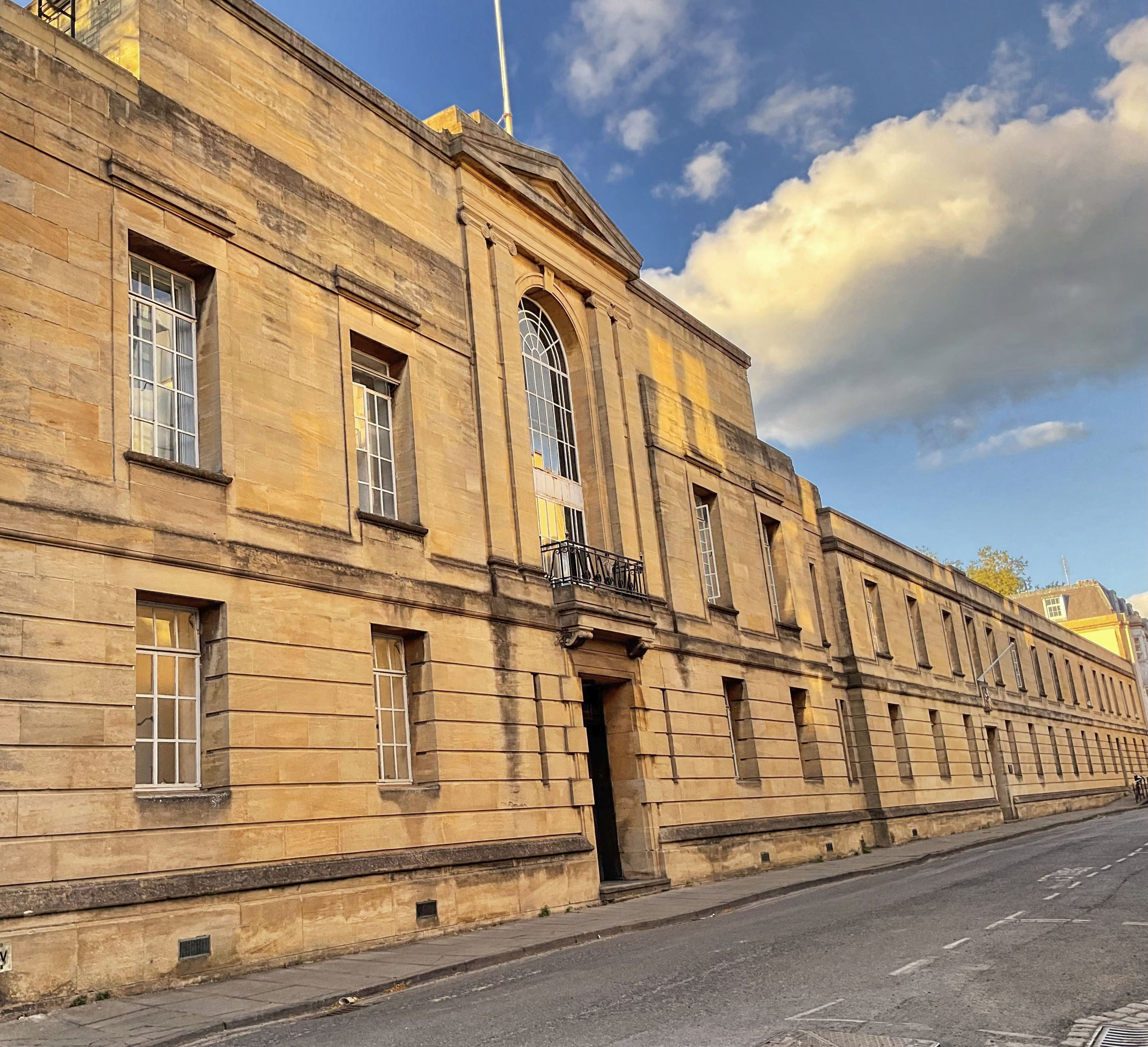
Regent's Park College, Oxford.

The union is a partner of 4 theological seminaries, namely South Wales Baptist College, Northern Baptist College, Bristol Baptist College and Spurgeon's College, and a university college, Regent's Park College. In March 2024, the St Hild Centre for Baptist Ministry, previously an affiliated centre of Northern Baptist College, entered membership with the Baptist Union of Great Britain in its own right.

== Organisation ==
The principal of the Union is the General Secretary. A number of paid staff provide leadership and practical support from the union's headquarters in Baptist House, Didcot, in areas such as finance, ministerial accreditation, and legal support.

=== List of general secretaries ===
- 1898 – 1924 John Howard Shakespeare
- 1925 – 1951 Melbourn Aubrey
- 1951 – 1967 Ernest A. Payne
- 1967 – 1982 David S. Russell
- 1982 – 1991 Bernard Green
- 1991 – 2006 David Coffey
- 2006 – 2013 Jonathan Edwards
- 2013 – Lynn Green

Since 2001, churches in membership with the Baptist Union of Great Britain have been organised into 13 Regional Associations:

- Central Baptist Association
- East Midlands Baptist Association
- Eastern Baptist Association
- Heart of England Baptist Association
- London Baptist Association
- North Western Baptist Association
- Northern Baptist Association
- South Eastern Baptist Association
- South Wales Baptist Association
- South West Baptist Association
- Southern Counties Baptist Association
- West of England Baptist Network (formerly West of England Baptist Association)
- Yorkshire Baptist Association

Regional Association teams, led by a number of Regional Ministers and a senior Regional Ministry Team Leader (RMTL), oversee and facilitate ministry in local churches. This may include pastoral support for ministers, signposting regional events, organising regional conferences, and supporting churches without a minister.

== Doctrinal controversies ==
At the Baptist Union Assembly in April 1971, Michael Taylor, then Principal at the Northern Baptist College, asserted, "I believe that God was active in Jesus, but it will not do to say quite categorically: Jesus is God." The statement bred controversy, and some charged him with denying the Deity of Christ. Nigel G. Wright, later Principal of Spurgeon's College, commenting on the affair, claimed the, "Spectre of theological downgrade had lingered within the denomination throughout the 20th century," alluding to the Downgrade Controversy of a century earlier.

== See also ==
- Baptist Union of Scotland
- Religion in the United Kingdom
- Regent's Park College, Oxford
- Baptist churches in the United Kingdom
- Spurgeon and the "Downgrade Controversy"
- Baptist beliefs
- Jesus Christ
- Believers' Church

== Bibliography ==
- Wardin, Albert W jr, Baptists Around the World.
- Payne, Ernest Alexander, The Baptist Union: A Short History.
- Brown, Raymond, The English Baptists of the Eighteenth Century.
- Briggs, JHY, The English Baptists of the Nineteenth Century.
- Clements, Keith, Baptists in the Twentieth Century.
