= John Wiche (Baptist) =

English Baptist minister

John Wiche (1718–1794) was an English Baptist minister.

== Life ==
He was born at Taunton, Somerset, on 24 April 1718. His parents were Baptists; his elder brother, George Wiche (died 2 November 1794, aged 78), originally a mechanic, became steward of the assembly rooms in Taunton, where his portrait, by Thorn, was placed by the subscribers. John Wiche was baptised on 25 June 1734 by Joseph Jefferies, Baptist minister of Taunton, from whom, and from Thomas Lucas, Baptist minister (1721–43) of Trowbridge, Wiltshire, he received his early education. By help of the general Baptist fund he studied successively at Taunton, Kendal, and Findern dissenting academies.

At Salisbury, where he was assistant and then minister to a declining Baptist congregation (1743–6), he became acquainted and corresponded with Thomas Chubb. In 1746 he went to London to consult Joseph Burroughs and James Foster about leaving the ministry. On their advice he became in December 1746 minister of a small General Baptist congregation at Maidstone, and held this charge till death. His views at this time were Arian, but in 1760 he became a Socinian, after reading the anonymous ‘Letter on the Logos,’ published in 1759, by Nathaniel Lardner. With Lardner he corresponded from 1762, if not earlier. Lardner fenced with him about the authorship of the ‘Letter,’ but on 9 June 1768 (six weeks before his death) wrote to inform him that the ‘Papinian’ to whom it had been addressed was John Shute Barrington, 1st Viscount Barrington.

Among his intimate friends was William Hazlitt, father of William Hazlitt the essayist, who had been presbyterian minister (1770–80) at Earl Street, Maidstone. After the Birmingham riots of 1791 he went to Henry Dundas (afterwards first Viscount Melville), then Home Secretary, with a deputation from Maidstone in Joseph Priestley's interest. Though his resources were scanty, he collected a considerable library. Wiche died at Maidstone on 7 April 1794. His portrait (no engraver's name) is given in the ‘Protestant Dissenter's Magazine,’ 1797.

== Works ==
He published, besides single sermons and tracts:

- ‘A Defence of … Foster's Sermon of Catholic Communion. By Philocatholicus,’ 1752, (anon., answered by Grantham Killingworth); and
- ‘Observations on the Debate … concerning the Divine Unity … addressed to the Rev. E. W. Whittaker of Canterbury,’ 1787.

To Priestley's Theological Repository,’ 1786, v. 83, he contributed ‘Observations favouring the Miraculous Conception,’ signed Nazaraeus (attributed by Thomas Belsham to Newcome Cappe).

Some time after Lardner's death Wiche obtained access to four of his manuscript sermons (preached 1747), and transcribed and published them as ‘Two Schemes of a Trinity … and the Divine Unity’.

== Family ==
He married, in 1755, Elizabeth Pine (d. 1767), by whom he had six children; his eldest son, Thomas (d. 11 July 1821, aged 63), became a London bookseller; his daughter Mary married in August 1795 John Evans (1767–1827), author of the ‘Sketch’ of Christian denominations. George Wiche or Wyche (1767–1799), dissenting minister at Monton, Lancashire, from 1788 to 1795, when he left the ministry and emigrated to America, was John Wiche's nephew.
