= Robert Hall (minister) =

British Baptist pastor

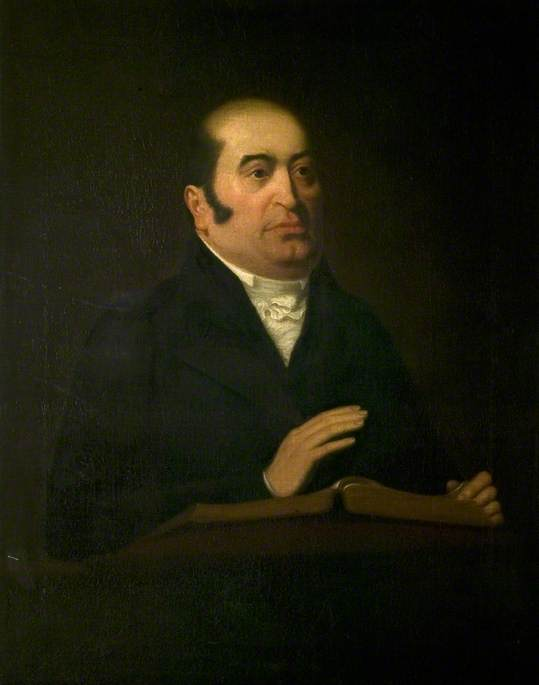
Robert Hall by John Flower, kept at the Nawarke Houses Museum in Leicester

The Rev. Robert Hall (2 May 1764 – 21 February 1831) was an English Baptist minister. He was known as a great pulpit orator, and for his written works.

== Early life ==
He was born at Arnesby near Leicester, the youngest of 14 in the family of the Baptist minister Robert Hall and his wife Jane Catchaside. He attended dame school and then the school of Mr Simmons at Wigston. Before he was nine he had read Jonathan Edwards's Treatise on the Will and Butler's Analogy.

Hall was sickly as a child, and out of concern for his health, his parents sent him to stay with a family friend, Beeby Wallis, near Kettering where he was deacon of the Baptist church. In a better physical state, Hall was moved to a school at Northampton run by John Ryland, where he remained a year and a half, studying Latin and Greek. There he heard Thomas Robins of Daventry Academy preach, a literary inspiration.

Returning home, Hall had his believer's baptism, and studied with his father. Aged 14, he entered the Bristol Baptist academy with a Ward scholarship. In 1780, he was set apart to the ministry by the Arnesby church. In 1781, under the terms of the scholarship, he entered King's College, Aberdeen, where he took the degree of M.A. in 1785 and befriended James Mackintosh.

== Bristol and Cambridge ==
Between his last two sessions at Aberdeen, Hall acted as assistant pastor to Caleb Evans at Broadmead chapel, Bristol, and three months after leaving the university he was appointed classical tutor in the Bristol academy, a post which he held for over five years. At this period his eloquence excited interest, and when he preached the chapel was generally crowded.

Under suspicion for heterodox views, Hall accepted an invitation from a congregation at St Andrew's Street Baptist Chapel, Cambridge, of which he became pastor in July 1791. He had by this time disowned the cardinal principles of Calvinism. It was during his Cambridge ministry of 15 years that his oratory was most brilliant. He adapted his style from Robert Robinson, his predecessor at the Chapel.

Hall's Cambridge congregation suffered an immediate secession after his first sermon, for reasons of doctrine. A group went to study under the Unitarian William Frend. Hall's severe views on leading Unitarians were given in an 1812 review of Thomas Belsham's Memoirs of Theophilus Lindsey; he considered Unitarians too close to the Church of England to be called Dissenters, and Lindsey too close to the English aristocracy. In 1795 Hall took issue with Charles Simeon who had preached in support of the French émigrés, and his views on Dissenters.

Hall began to suffer from mental derangement in November 1804. He recovered and was able to resume his duties in April 1805, but a recurrence forced him to resign his pastoral office in March 1806.

== Later life and death ==
On leaving Cambridge Hall paid a visit to his relatives in Leicestershire, and then for some time resided at Enderby preaching occasionally in some of the neighbouring villages. Latterly he ministered to a small congregation in Harvey Lane, Leicester, and at the close of 1806 he accepted a call to be their stated pastor. In the autumn of 1807 he moved on from Enderby to Leicester.

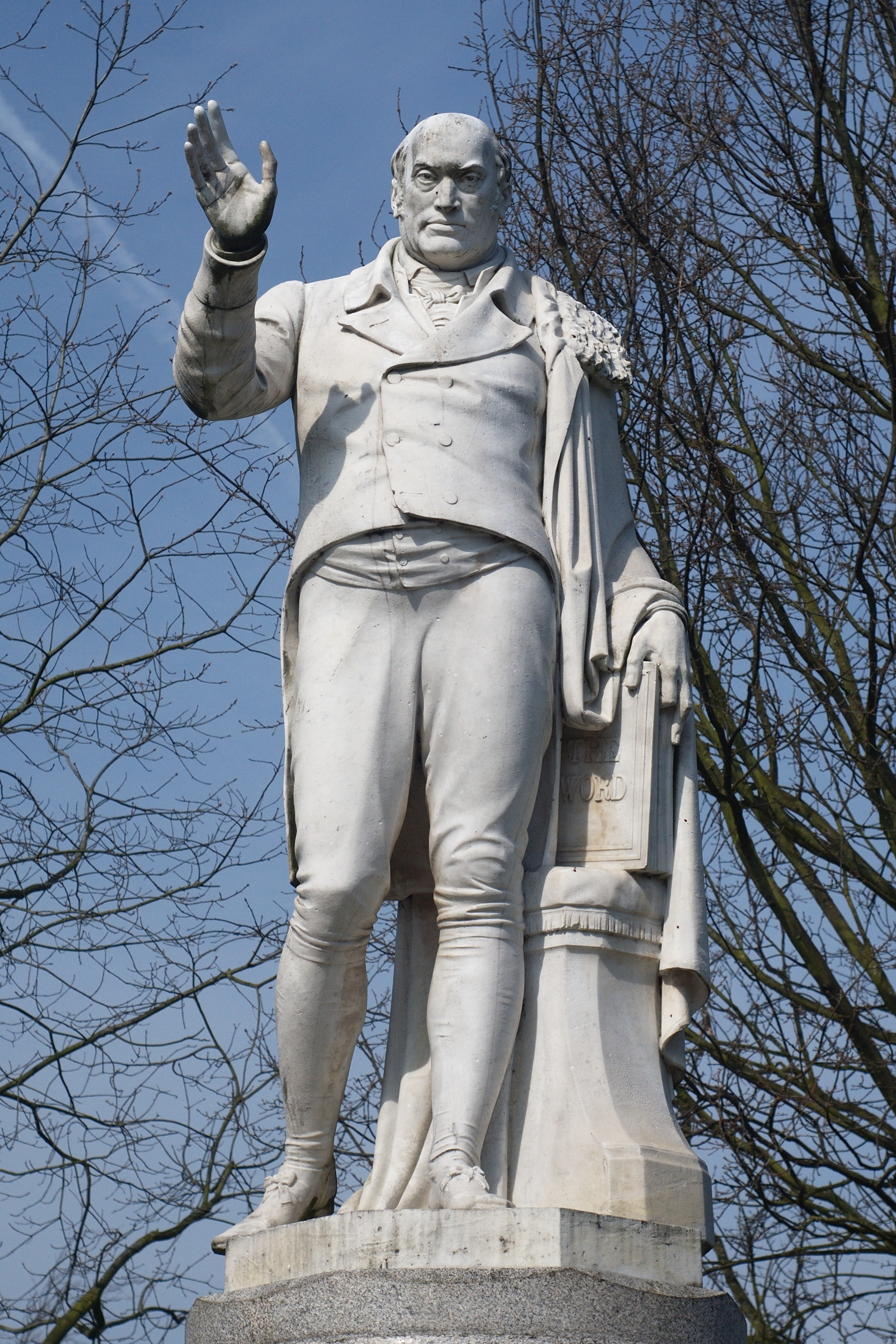
Statue of Robert Hall (by sculptor John Birnie Philip), De Montfort Square, off New Walk, Leicester

On the death of John Ryland, Hall was invited to return to the pastorate of Broadmead Chapel, Bristol. The peace of his congregation at Leicester had been to some degree disturbed by a controversy regarding several cases of discipline; he accepted the invitation, and moved there in April 1826.

Robert Hall died of heart failure at Bristol on 21 February 1831. Eight funeral sermons were published, by John Birt, Newton Bosworth, Philip Cater, Francis Augustus Cox, John Eustace Giles, Joseph Hughes, James Phillippo Mursell and Thomas Swan. Reminiscences of the Rev. Robert Hall: Late of Bristol, and Sketches of His Sermons Preached at Cambridge Prior to 1806 by John Greene of Birmingham appeared in 1832. Memoirs and Private Correspondence of the Rev. Robert Hall, of Bristol by Olinthus Gregory was published in 1833, and Biographical Recollections of the Rev. Robert Hall, A.M. by John Webster Morris in the same year.

== Works ==
Hall's works were edited by Olinthus Gregory, collected in six volumes, published 1832. Volume VI contained a memoir by Gregory, and an essay by John Foster dealing with his character and preaching. He had published:

- Christianity consistent with the Love of Freedom (1791), defending the political conduct of dissenters against attacks from John Clayton after the Priestley Riots, prompted by Clayton's sermon that year The Duty of Christians to Magistrates.
- Apology for the Freedom of the Press (1793), not republished after the third edition. In a new edition of 1821 he omitted an attack on Bishop Samuel Horsley, and stated that his political opinions had undergone no substantial change.
- On Modern Infidelity (1801), sermon
- Reflections on War (1802), sermon given at Cambridge on 1 June to celebrate the Treaty of Amiens
- Sentiments proper to the present Crisis (1803), sermon

Hall's writings at Leicester embraced various tracts printed for private circulation; a number of contributions to the Eclectic Review, among which may be mentioned his articles on Foster's Essays and on Zeal without Innovation; several sermons, including those On the Advantages of Knowledge to the Lower Classes (1810), On the Death of the Princess Charlotte (1817), and On the Death of Dr Ryland (1825); and his pamphlet on Terms of Communion, in which he advocated intercommunion with all those who acknowledged the "essentials" of Christianity.

In 1819 Hall published an edition in one volume of his sermons formerly printed.

== Family ==
In 1808 Hall married Eliza Smith, who had been cook for Thomas Edmonds, a Baptist minister at Clipstone. There were three daughters and two sons of the marriage.

== Reputation ==
Of Hall at King's College, Aberdeen in the 1780s, his friend James Mackintosh wrote that he

[...] then displayed the same acuteness and brilliancy; the same extraordinary vigour, both of understanding and imagination, which have since distinguished him, and which would have secured to him much more of the admiration of the learned and the elegant, if he had not consecrated his genius to the far nobler office of instructing and reforming the poor.

Samuel Parr in his Spital Sermon (1800) wrote:

Having stated my wishes, that in a few, I mean a very few instances, Mr. Hall had been a little more wary in pushing his principles to consequences, which they may not quite warrant, I will give my general opinion of him in the words that were employed to describe a prelate, whose writings, I believe, are familiar to him, and whom he strongly resembles, not perhaps in variety of learning, but in fertility of imagination, in vigour of thinking, in rectitude of intention, and holiness of life. Yes, Mr. Hall, like Bishop Taylor, has "the eloquence of an orator, the fancy of a poet, the acuteness of a schoolman, the profoundness of a philosopher, and the piety of a saint."

Beilby Porteus, Bishop of London, arranged to meet Hall for dinner through John Owen.

== Archives ==
Papers of Robert Hall are held at the Cadbury Research Library, University of Birmingham.
