= The Raggle Taggle Gypsy =

Traditional folk song

- English folk song
- Catalogue: Child Ballad 200; Roud Folk Song Index 1
- Genre: Border ballad
- Language: English
- Also known as: "Gypsy Davy", "Gypsum Davy", "The Raggle Taggle Gypsies O", "The Gypsy Laddie(s)", "Black Jack David" (or "Davy"), "Seven Yellow Gypsies"

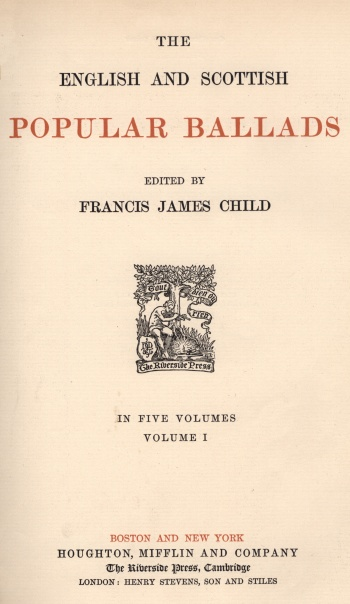
Cover of Francis James Child's The English and Scottish Popular Ballads

"The Raggle Taggle Gypsy" (Roud 1, Child 200), is a traditional folk song that originated as a Scottish border ballad, and has been popular throughout Britain, Ireland and North America. It concerns a rich lady who runs off to join the gypsies (or one gypsy). Common alternative names are "Gypsy Davy", "Gypsum Davy", "The Raggle Taggle Gypsies O", "The Gypsy Laddie(s)", "Black Jack David" (or "Davy") and "Seven Yellow Gypsies".

In the folk tradition the song was extremely popular, spread all over the English-speaking world by broadsheets and oral tradition.

== Synopsis ==
The Raggle Taggle Gypsy
The Waterboys' recording of "The Raggle Taggle Gypsy", from the album Room to Roam.

The core of the song's story is that a lady forsakes a life of luxury to run off with a band of gypsies. In some versions there is one individual, named Johnny Faa or Black Jack Davy, whereas in others there is one leader and his six brothers. In some versions the lady is identified as Margaret Kennedy, the wife of the Scottish Earl of Cassilis.

In a typical version, the lord comes home to find his lady "gone with the gypsy laddie". Sometimes this is because the gypsies have charmed her with their singing or even cast a spell over her.

He saddles his fastest horse to follow her. He finds her and bids her come home, asking "Would you forsake your husband and child?" She refuses to return, in many versions, preferring the cold ground, stating, "What care I for your goose feather bed?", and the gypsy's company to her lord's wealth and comfortable life.

At the end of some versions, the husband kills the gypsies. In the local Cassilis tradition, they are hanged on the Cassilis Dule Tree.

== Origins and early history ==
=== "The Gypsy Loddy", c.1720 ===
The earliest text may be "The Gypsy Loddy", published in the Roxburghe Ballads with an assigned date of 1720. The first two verses of this version are as follows:

There was seven gypsies all in a gang,
They were brisk and bonny, O;
They rode till they came to the Earl of Casstle's house,
And there they sang most sweetly, O.

The Earl of Castle's lady came down,
With the waiting-maid beside her;
As soon as her fair face they saw,
They called their grandmother over.

In the final two lines shown above, they called their grandmother over is assumed to be a corruption of They cast their glamour over her (i.e. they cast a spell), not vice versa. This is the motivation in many texts for the lady leaving her lord; in others she leaves of her own free will.

=== Johnny Faa and the Earl of Cassilis ===
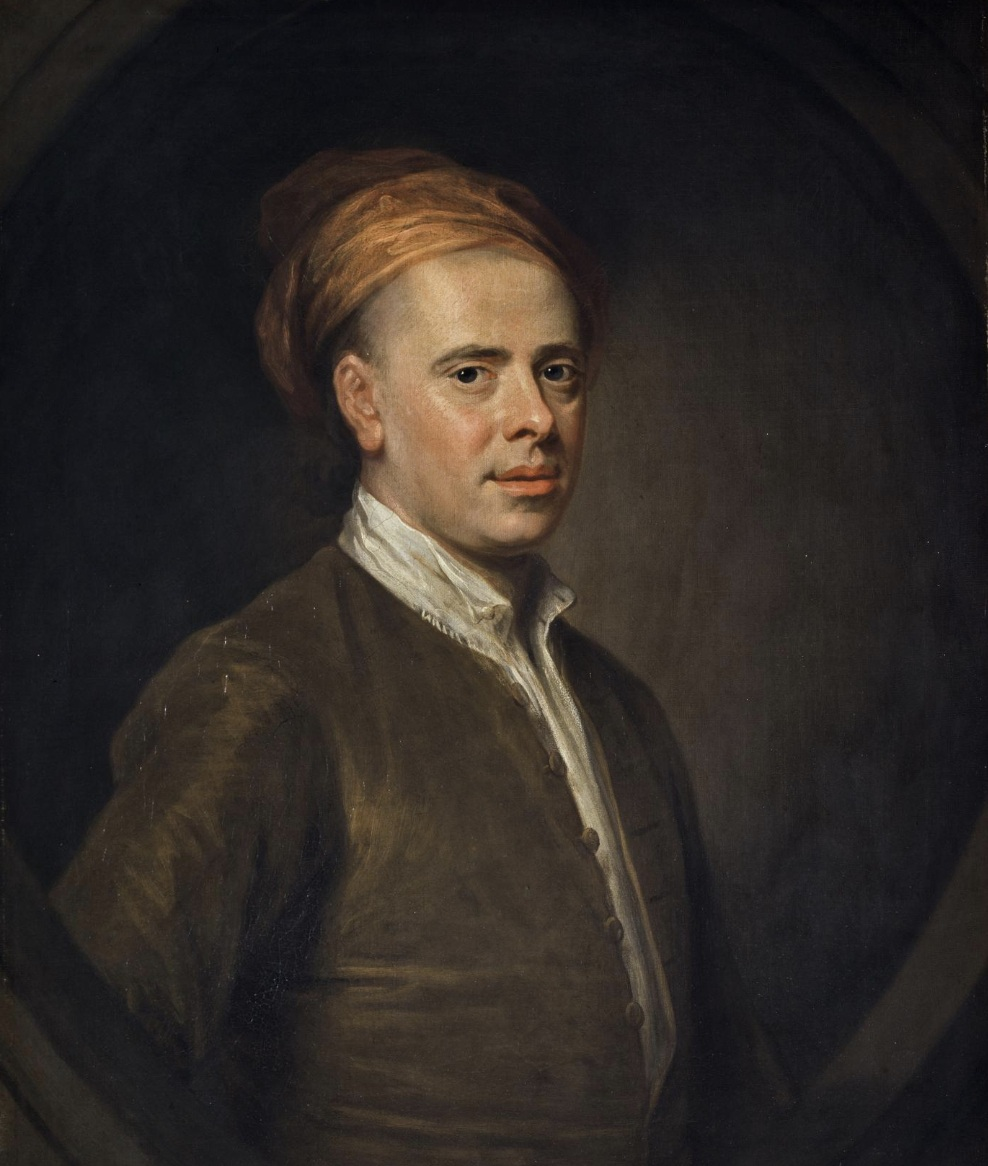
Allan Ramsay

A more certain date than that of "The Gypsy Loddy", c.1720 of a version from 1740 in Allan Ramsay's Tea-Table Miscellany, which included the ballad as of "The Gypsy Johnny Faa". Many printed versions after this appear to copy Ramsay, including nineteenth century broadside versions. Nick Tosches, in his Country: The Twisted Roots of Rock 'N' Roll, spends part of his first chapter examining the song's history. The ballad, according to Tosches, retells the story of John Faa, a Scottish 17th-century Gypsy outlaw, and Lady Jane Hamilton, wife of The Earl of Cassilis (identified in local tradition as the John Kennedy 6th Earl of Cassilis). Lord Cassilis led a band of men (some sources say 16, others 7), to abduct her. They were caught and hanged on the "Dool Tree" in 1643. The "Gypsies" were killed (except for one, who escaped) and Lady Jane Hamilton was imprisoned for the remainder of her life, dying in 1642. Tosches also compares the song's narrative to the ancient Greek myth of Orpheus and Eurydice.

=== Common ancestor and "Lady Cassiles Lilt" ===
Differences between "The Gypsy Loddy" (c.1720) and "The Gypsy Johnny Faa" (1740) suggest that they derive from one or more earlier versions, so the song is most likely at least as old as the seventeenth century. B. H. Bronson discovered that a tune in the Skene manuscripts and dated earlier than 1600 resembles later tunes for this song and is entitled "Lady Cassiles Lilt". The inference is that a song concerning Lord and Lady Cassilis existed before the two earliest manuscripts and was the source of both.

=== Robert Burns ===
Robert Burns used the song in his Reliques of Robert Burns; consisting chiefly of original letters, poems, and critical observations on Scottish songs (1808). Due to the Romanichal origins of the main protagonist Davie or Johnny Faa, the ballad was translated into Anglo-Romany in 1890 by the Gypsy Lore Society.

== Traditional recordings ==
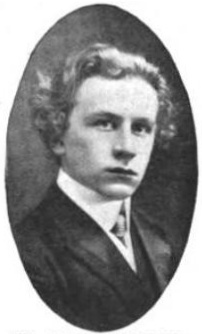
Percy Grainger, composer and song collector

Hundreds of versions of the song survived in the oral tradition well into the twentieth century and were recorded by folklorists from traditional singer. The song was popular in England, where recordings were made of figures including Harry Cox, Walter Pardon and Frank Hinchliffe singing the song in the 1960s and 70s. In 1908 the composer and song collector Percy Grainger used phonograph technology to record a man named Archer Lane of Winchcombe, Gloucestershire, singing a version of the song; the recording is available in two parts on the British Library Sound Archive website.

Many Irish traditional singers have performed versions learnt in the oral tradition, including Paddy Tunney, John Reilly and Robert Cinnamond; Paddy Tunney's recording is available on the Irish Traditional Music Archive.

Some traditional recordings were made in Scotland, including by the Scottish traveller Jeannie Robertson and her daughter Lizzie Higgins, whose version can be heard online via the Vaughan Williams Memorial Library.

The song has been recorded many times in the United States, mostly under the title of "Gypsy Davy" or "Black Jack Davy", by people whose ancestors brought the songs from Britain and Ireland. American performers include the Appalachian musicians Jean Ritchie, Buell Kazee, Bascom Lamar Lunsford, Dillard Chandler and Texas Gladden; James Madison Carpenter recorded a woman singing a version in Boone, North Carolina in the early 1930s, which can be heard on the Vaughan Williams Memorial Library website. Many traditional Ozark singers including Almeda Riddle and Ollie Gilbert whose recording can be heard via the Max Hunter collection.

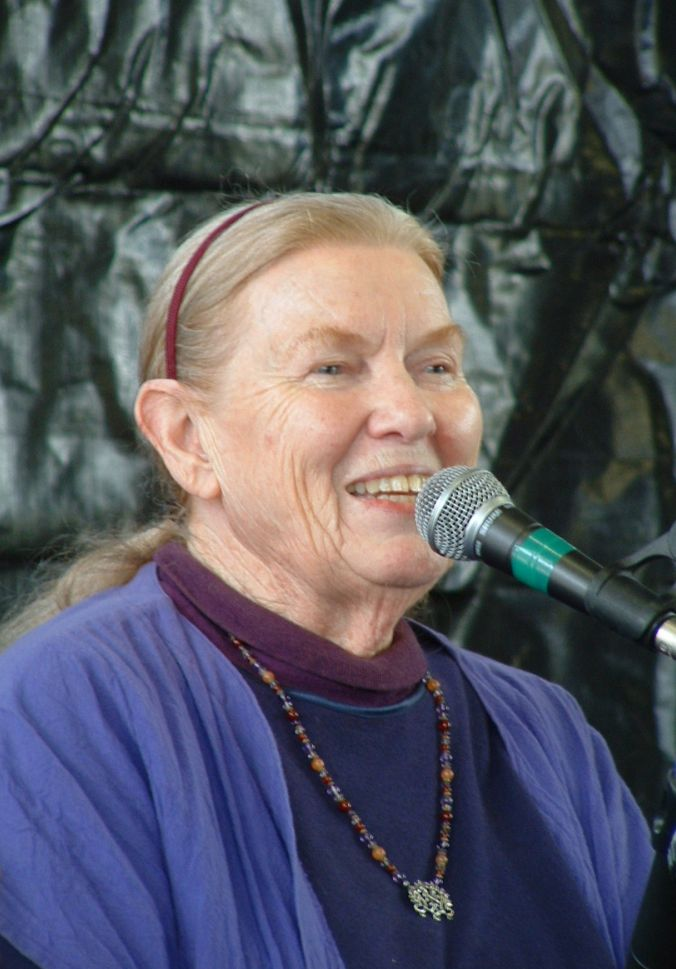
Jean Ritchie, Appalachian singer

The following four verses are the beginning of the Ritchie family version of "Gypsy Laddie", as sung by Jean Ritchie:

An English lord came home one night
Inquiring for his Lady.
The servants said on every hand,
She’s gone with the Gypsy Laddie.

Go saddle up my milk white steed,
Go saddle me up my brownie,
And I will ride both night and day
Till I overtake my bonnie.

Oh, he rode East and he rode West,
And at last he found her.
She was lying on the green, green grass
And the gypsy’s arms all around her.

Oh, how can you leave your house and land?
How can you leave your money?
How can you leave your rich, young Lord
To be a gypsy’s bonnie?

== Recent history ==
At the start of the twentieth century, one version, collected and set to piano accompaniment by Cecil Sharp, reached a much wider public. Under the title "The Wraggle Taggle Gypsies O!", it was published in several collections, most notably one entitled English Folk Songs for Schools, leading the song to be taught to generations of English school children. It was later occasionally used by jazz musicians, for example the instrumental "Raggle Taggle" by the Territory band Boots and His Buddies, and the vocal recording by Maxine Sullivan.

In America, the country music recording industry spread versions of the song by such notable musicians as Cliff Carlisle and the Carter Family, and later by the rockabilly singer Warren Smith, under the title "Black Jack David". In the American folk music revival, Woody Guthrie sang and copyrighted a version he called "Gypsy Davy" (which was later also sung by his son Arlo).

=== Popular recordings ===
A vast number of artists and groups have recorded the song. This selection is limited to artists and/or albums found in other Wikipedia articles:

Album or single title	Performer	Year	Title variant	Notes
Early American Ballads'	John Jacob Niles	1938	"The Gypsie Laddie"	78 rpm record album
"Black Jack David"	Cliff Carlisle	1939	"Black Jack David"	Single on Decca label, reissued on Blue Yodeller And Steel Guitar Wizard (1996) & A Country Legacy (2004)
"Black Jack David"	Carter Family	1940	"Black Jack David"	Single on Okeh label, resissued on several albums
"Gypsy Davy"	Woody Guthrie	1944	"Gypsy Davy"	Single recorded by Moses Asch reissued on several albums
"Black Jack David"	T. Texas Tyler	1952	"Black Jack David"	Single, reissued on CD by the British Archive of Country Music (BACM)
"Black Jack David"	Warren Smith	1956	"Black Jack David"	Single, reissued on several albums
"The Wraggle Taggle Gipsies"; Folk Songs & Ballades of Elizabethan England	Alfred Deller	1956	"The Wraggle Taggle Gipsies"	Vinyl LP the Cecil Sharp version sung in Elizabethan style by countertenor
The Foggy Dew and Other Traditional English Love Songs	A. L. Lloyd	1956	"The Seven Gypsies"	
Pete Seeger Sings American Ballads	Pete Seeger	1957	"Gypsy Davy"	
Songs and Ballads of the Ozarks	Almeda Riddle	1960	"Black Jack Davey"	
British Traditional Ballads in the Southern Mountains Volume 1	Jean Ritchie	1961	"Gypsy Laddie"	
The English And Scottish Popular Ballads; Vol.2, F.J. Child Ballads	Ewan MacColl	1961	"The Gypsy Laddie"	
Folk, Blues and Beyond	Davey Graham	1964	"Seven Gypsies"	
All the Good Times	Alice Stuart	1964	"Black Jack David"	
Remembrance of Things to Come	New Lost City Ramblers	1966	"Black Jack Daisy"	
The Power of the True Love Knot	Shirley Collins	1968	"Seven Yellow Gypsies"	
Prince Heathen	Martin Carthy and Dave Swarbrick	1969	"Seven Yellow Gypsies"	Reissued on Martin Carthy: A Collection (Topic: TSCD750, 1999), Carthy also sings it live in the studio in July 2006 for the DVD Guitar Maestros.
Ride a Hustler's Dream	Elmer Gantry's Velvet Opera	1969	"Black Jack Davy"	
I Looked Up	The Incredible String Band	1970	"Black Jack Davy"	Also (as "Black Jack David") on Earthspan (1972)
The Kerbside Entertainers	Don Partridge	1971	"Raggle Taggle Gypsies"	Solo vocal with acoustic guitar
Last of the Brooklyn Cowboys	Arlo Guthrie	1973	"Gypsy Davy"	Charted at #23 on Billboard Easy Listening chart
Planxty	Planxty	1973	"Raggle Taggle Gypsy"	Version learnt from John Reilly (see below 1977)
The Shipbuilder	Bob Pegg & Nick Strutt	1974	"The Raggle Taggle Gypsies"	
Mo’ Roots	Taj Mahal (musician)	1974	"Blackjack Davey"	
All Around My Hat	Steeleye Span	1975	"Black Jack Davey"	Also on On Tour (1983) and Gone to Australia (2001) (live albums) and Present - The Very Best of Steeleye Span (2002)
For Pence and Spicy Ale	Mike Waterson	1975	"Seven Yellow Gypsies"	
Are Ye Sleeping Maggie	The Tannahill Weavers	1976	"The Gypsy Laddie"	
Traditional Ballads of Scotland	Alex Campbell	1977	"The Gypsy Laddie"	
The Bonny Green Tree; Songs of an Irish Traveller	John Reilly	1977	"The Raggle Taggle Gypsy"	Recorded 1967 The version learnt by Christy Moore and popularised among Irish groups
Shreds and Patches	John Kirkpatrick & Sue Harris	1977	"The Gypsy Laddie"	
There Was a Maid	Dolores Keane	1978	"Seven Yellow Gypsies"	Version of Paddy Doran (see below 2012)
Watching the White Wheat	The King's Singers	1986	"The Raggle Taggle Gypsies"	The Cecil Sharp version, highly arranged for male-voice a capella group
The Voice of the People Vol 6 Tonight I'll Make You My Bride	Walter Pardon	1988	"The Raggle-Taggle Gypsies"	Recorded 1975
The Voice of the People Vol 17; It Fell on a Day, a Bonny Summer Day	Jeannie Robertson	1988	"The Gypsy Laddies"	Recorded 1953
In Search of Nic Jones	Nic Jones	1988	"Seven Yellow Gypsies"	Recorded 1981 for BBC Radio 2 Radio Folk
Room to Roam	The Waterboys	1990	"The Raggle Taggle Gypsy"	
New Britain: The Roots of American Folksong	Boston Camerata	1990	"Gipsy Davy"	
The Boatman's Daughter	Golden Bough	1992	"Black Jack Davy"	This version written by Paul Espinoza of Golden Bough
Fiddler's Green	Fiddler's Green	1992	"The Raggle Taggle Gypsy"	
Good as I Been to You	Bob Dylan	1992	"Blackjack Davey"	
Serrated Edge	Tempest	1992	"Raggle Taggle Gypsy"	
Sunken Treasures	Tempest	1993	"Black Jack Davy"	A Cover of the Golden Bough song of the same name
Gypsies & Lovers	The Irish Descendants	1994	"Raggle Taggle Gypsy"	
Comet	Cordelia's Dad	1995	"Gypsy Davy"	
The True Lover's Farewell – Appalachian Folk Ballads	Custer LaRue	1995	"Gypsen Davey"	
Neat and Complete	Sandra Kerr & Nancy Kerr	1996	"Seven Yellow Gypsies"	
Starry Gazy Pie	Nancy Kerr & James Fagan	1997	"Seven Yellow Gypsies"	
October Song	The House Band	1998	"Seven Yellow Gypsies"	
Pastures of Plenty	JSD Band	1998	"The Gypsy Laddie"	
Blackjack David	Dave Alvin	1998	"Blackjack David"	
Traveller	Christy Moore	1999	"Raggle Taggle Gypsy"	
Os Amores Libres	Carlos Núñez	1999	"The Raggle Taggle Gypsy"	Sung by Mike Scott
Broken Ground	Waterson:Carthy	1999	"Raggle Taggle Gypsies"	Sung by Eliza Carthy
Harry Smith's Anthology of American Folk Music, Vol. 4	Carter Family	2000	"Black Jack David"	Reissue of 1940 recording (see above)
Long Expectant Comes At Last	Cathal McConnell	2000	"The Gypsies"	Also in "I Have Travelled This Country – Songs of Cathal McConnell", a book of 123 songs with accompanying recordings
The Alan Lomax Collection: Portraits; Texas Gladden – Ballad Legacy	Texas Gladden	2001	"Gypsy Davy"	Recorded 1941
The Bonny Labouring Boy	Harry Cox	2001	"Black-Hearted Gypsies O"	Recorded 1965
Hattie Mae Tyler Cargill	Debra Cowan	2001	"Dark-Skinned Davy"	
Wayfaring Stranger: Folksongs	Andreas Scholl	2001	"The Wraggle-Taggle Gypsies, O!"	Sung as dialogue between counter-tenor and baritone, accompanied by Edin Karamazov & the Orpheus Chamber Orchestra.
Away with the Fairies	Mad Dog Mcrea	2002	"Raggle Taggle Gypsy"	
Further Down the Old Plank Road	The Chieftains	2003	"The Raggle Taggle Gypsy"	Featuring Nickel Creek
Seven Nation Army	The White Stripes	2003	"Black Jack Davey"	B-side of Seven Nation Army CD single
Swinging Miss Loch Lomond 1952–1959	Maxine Sullivan	2004	"Wraggle-Taggle Gypsies"	Single recorded in 1950's
With Us	The Black Pine	2004	"Black Jack David"	
Voice	Alison Moyet	2004	"The Wraggle-Taggle Gypsies-O"	
The Irish Connection	Johnny Logan	2007	"Raggle Taggle Gypsy"	
Celtic Fire	Rapalje	2007	"The Raggle Taggle Gypsy"	
The Song Train	Harvey Reid	2007	"Black Jack Davy"	Sung by Joyce Andersen
Act Two	Celtic Thunder	2008	"Raggle Taggle Gypsy"	
Fotheringay 2	Fotheringay	2008	"Gypsy Davey"	Recorded 1970
A Folk Song a Day: April	Jon Boden	2011	"Seven Yellow Gypsies"	
The Voice of the People; Good People Take Warning	Paddy Doran	2012	"Seven Yellow Gypsies"	Recorded 1952
The Voice of the People; I'm A Romani Rai	Carolyne Hughes	2012	"The Draggle-Tail Gypsies"	Recorded 1968
The Speyside Sessions	Speyside Sessions	2012	"Raggle Taggle Gypsy"	
A North Country Lass	Lesley Garrett	2012	"The Raggle Taggle Gypsies"	The Cecil Sharp version, performed by classical soprano and orchestra
My Dearest Darkest Neighbor	Hurray for the Riff Raff	2013	"Black Jack Davey"	
Country Soul	Derek Ryan	2013	"Raggle-Taggle Gypsy"	
The Norway Sessions	The Electrics	2014	"Rockin' Taggle Gypsy"	
"Raggle Taggle Gypsy"	Dylan Walshe	2015	"Raggle Taggle Gypsy"	Muddy Roots label, appears on the live album Soul Hell Cafe
From Without	Ferocious Dog	2015	"Raggle Taggle Gypsy"	
Ballads Long and Short	John Roberts and Debra Cowan	2015	"Gypsum Davey"	
Strange Country	Kacy & Clayton	2016	"Seven Yellow Gypsies"	
Look Both Ways	Steamchicken	2017	"Gypsy"	
Origins	Dark Moor	2018	"Raggle Taggle Gypsy"	
The Hare's Lament	Ye Vagabonds	2019	"Seven Little Gypsies"	
The Livelong Day	Lankum	2019	"The Dark Eyed Gypsy"	
“Gypsy Davey” b/w “Mushi No Uta”	Kikagaku Moyo	2020	"Gypsy Davey"	Single released on SubPop, follows the arrangement of Fotheringay’s 1970 version (released in 2008)
Mighty Poplar	Mighty Poplar	2023	"Blackjack Davy"	
An Tairseach	Doireann Ní Ghlacáin	2026	"seacht ‖ 7"	

== Related songs ==
The song "The Whistling Gypsy" also describes a lady running off with a "gypsy rover". However, there is no melancholy, no hardship and no conflict.

The Bob Dylan song "Tin Angel" from 2012's album Tempest is derived from "The Raggle Taggle Gypsy".

The song "Lizzie Lindsay" has a similar theme. Robert Burns adapted the song into "Sweet Tibby Dunbar", a shorter version of the story. There is also a children's version by Elizabeth Mitchell which has lyrical content changed to be about a young girl "charming hearts of the ladies", and sailing "across the deep blue sea, where the skies are always sunny".

Although the hero of this song is often called "Johnny Faa" or even "Davy Faa", he should not be confused with the hero/villain of "Davy Faa (Remember the Barley Straw)". [Silber and Silber misidentify all their texts] as deriving from "Child 120", which is actually "Robin Hood's Death". According to The Faber Book of Ballads the name Faa was common among Gypsies in the 17th century.

Bella Hardy's song "Good Man's Wife" is in the voice of Lord Cassillis' wife. The theme of the song is how she fell in love with the gypsy as her marriage turned cold, and the song ends with the familiar exchange of featherbed and wealth for sleeping in a field with her love; the husband's pursuit does not occur.

== Broadsides ==
- Bodleian, Harding B 11(1446), "Gypsy Laddie", W. Stephenson (Gateshead), 1821–1838; also Harding B 11(2903), "Gypsy Loddy"; Harding B 19(45), "The Dark-Eyed Gipsy O"; Harding B 25(731), "Gipsy Loddy"; Firth b.25(220), "The Gipsy Laddy"; Harding B 11(1317), "The Gipsy Laddie, O"; Firth b.26(198), Harding B 15(116b), 2806 c.14(140), "The Gipsy Laddie"; Firth b.25(56), "Gypsie Laddie"
- Murray, Mu23-y3:030, "The Gypsy Laddie", unknown, 19C
- NLScotland, L.C.Fol.178.A.2(092), "The Gipsy Laddie", unknown, c. 1875
