= Maybole Castle =

Castle in South Ayrshire, Scotland

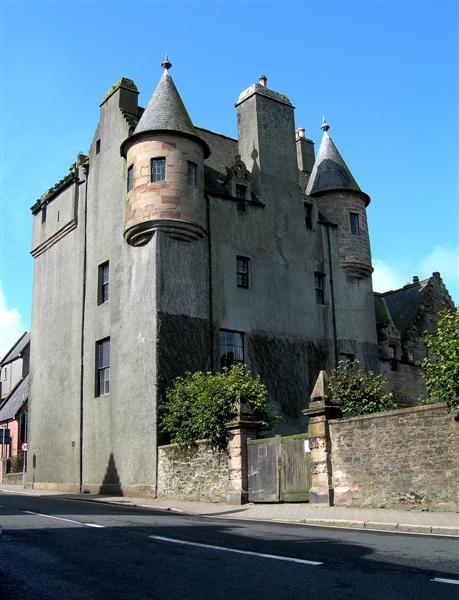

- Location within South Ayrshire
- 55.3548°N 4.6810°W
- Location: Maybole
- OS grid reference: NS 30130 10029

History
- Built: 16th century

Listed Building – Category A
- Official name: High Street, Maybole Castle, Garden Walls and Gatepiers
- Designated: 14 April 1971
- Reference no.: LB37709

Maybole Castle is a 16th-century castle located on High Street in Maybole, South Ayrshire, Scotland. Originally built for the Earls of Cassillis, it is an L-shaped construction with Victorian two-storey extensions. It is associated with a legend of John Faa, in which an earl killed Faa and imprisoned his wife, the Countess of Cassillis, in the castle.

The castle became a Category A listed building in 1971. It was added to the Buildings at Risk Register for Scotland in 2009, before receiving funding in the early 21st century for renovations.

== Description ==
The castle is located on High Street, which links the castle to the Maybole Town Hall.

It is a 16th-century L-plan castle, spanning four floors, and harled. Two corners feature circular corbelled bartizans with conical roofs on the north-east side. The walls are up to 7 feet (2.1 m) thick, although there is a lot of decorative stonework, including faces around one the oriel window on the south-west side. A recessed area on the exterior of the tower originally displayed the coat of arms of the Cassillis family. The original entrance was located at the bottom of the stair-tower, with the main hall, maids room and pantry on the first floor and the upper levels divided into multiple chambers. The lower floor consists of vaulted cellars, as well as the kitchen and scullery. Early 19th century additions include the two-storey wings on the west and south sides.

== History ==
=== Early use ===
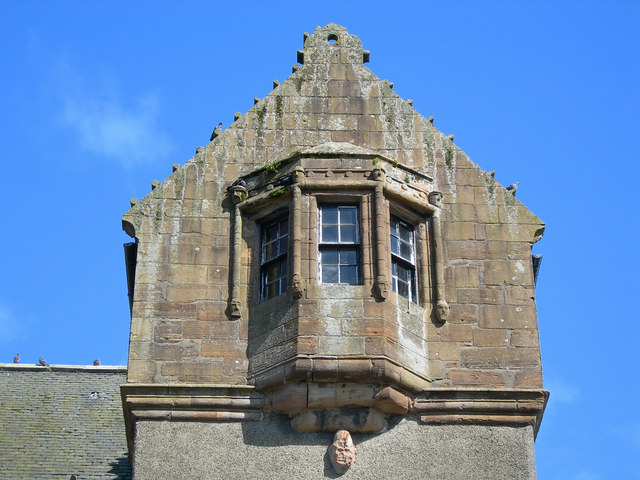
The oriel window

The castle was originally a house of the Earls of Cassillis, sometimes known as the "Kings of Carrick". It was built around 1560, and thought to have been originally for Gilbert Kennedy, 4th Earl of Cassillis or John Kennedy, 5th Earl of Cassillis. Margaret Kennedy, Countess of Cassillis wrote from the castle in 1578 about wishing to order some luxury items. The items included velvet for a cloak, and a locket, along with various other items.

Towards the end of the 16th century, a feud arose between the Earls of Cassillis and the Lairds of Bargany, following the actions of Thomas Kennedy regarding lands of an abbey in which the Earl had tortured the owner, Allan Stewart, to sign a lease. In 1601 this resulted in John Kennedy, 5th Earl of Cassillis, and 200 armed followers setting off from Maybole Castle and resulting in the death of Gilbert Kennedy of Bargany and Ardstinchar and some of his followers whilst on a ride from Ayr. However the party were found not guilty of murder, and was instead noted as an act of service to the King

It is one of a number of castles in and around Maybole, including Blairquhan Castle, Culzean Castle, Turnberry Castle. A 1686 census indicated Maybole included 28 lords and landowners who had estates in Carrick and the surrounding area.

By the start of the 19th century, it had fallen into disrepair and in 1805 part of the original castle was demolished and the main entrance was modified. Maybole became more accessible in the 19th century thanks to the efforts of Niven of Kirkbride who opened up roads through moats and outer fortified walls. The castle was renovated and expanded with the addition of rubble-built two-storey gabled wings on the west and south sides, sometime before 1856.

Around 1837, Robert Brandard produced an engraving of the castle, based on original works by William Henry Bartlett. Later, in the 1890s, architect and artist Charles Rennie Mackintosh examined the castle as part of this own "perpetual interest in recording the decorative details of the buildings of the 'old national style'". His drawings showed the location of damage to the harling which revealed the masonry underneath. It also recorded details of the decorative stonework.

=== Legend of John Faa ===
The castle is featured in the legend of John Faa (sometimes referred to as "King of the Gypsies"), The Countess and the Gypsy, which is a version of the ballad The Raggle Taggle Gypsy. The legend says that Faa ran away with a Countess of Cassillis, and her husband, the Earl, hung Faa from a dule tree. He then imprisoned his wife in the castle for the rest of her life, before eventually remarrying. The Earl is also have said to have incorporated an oriel window into the castle for her to look out of, surrounded by carvings of the faces of Faa and his accomplices. The Earl in question is usually thought by historians to be John Kennedy, 6th Earl of Cassillis; however, the oriel window was already in place before this time and the story is thought to be a work of fiction. Nonetheless, the window with the oriel window is still referred to as "The Countess's Room". Some versions suggest the lady was Margaret Kennedy, setting the story at an earlier date.

=== 20th century ===
In 1919, a fire broke out at the castle. Although only basic equipment was available at the time, the damage to the castle was limited to the roof and has since been repaired. Writing in 2001, local historian Davie Hunter said that charred timbers could still be seen in the roofspace. It become a category A listed building in April 1974, along with its rubble-built garden walls, in recognition of its national importance as the town mansion of the Earls of Cassillis.

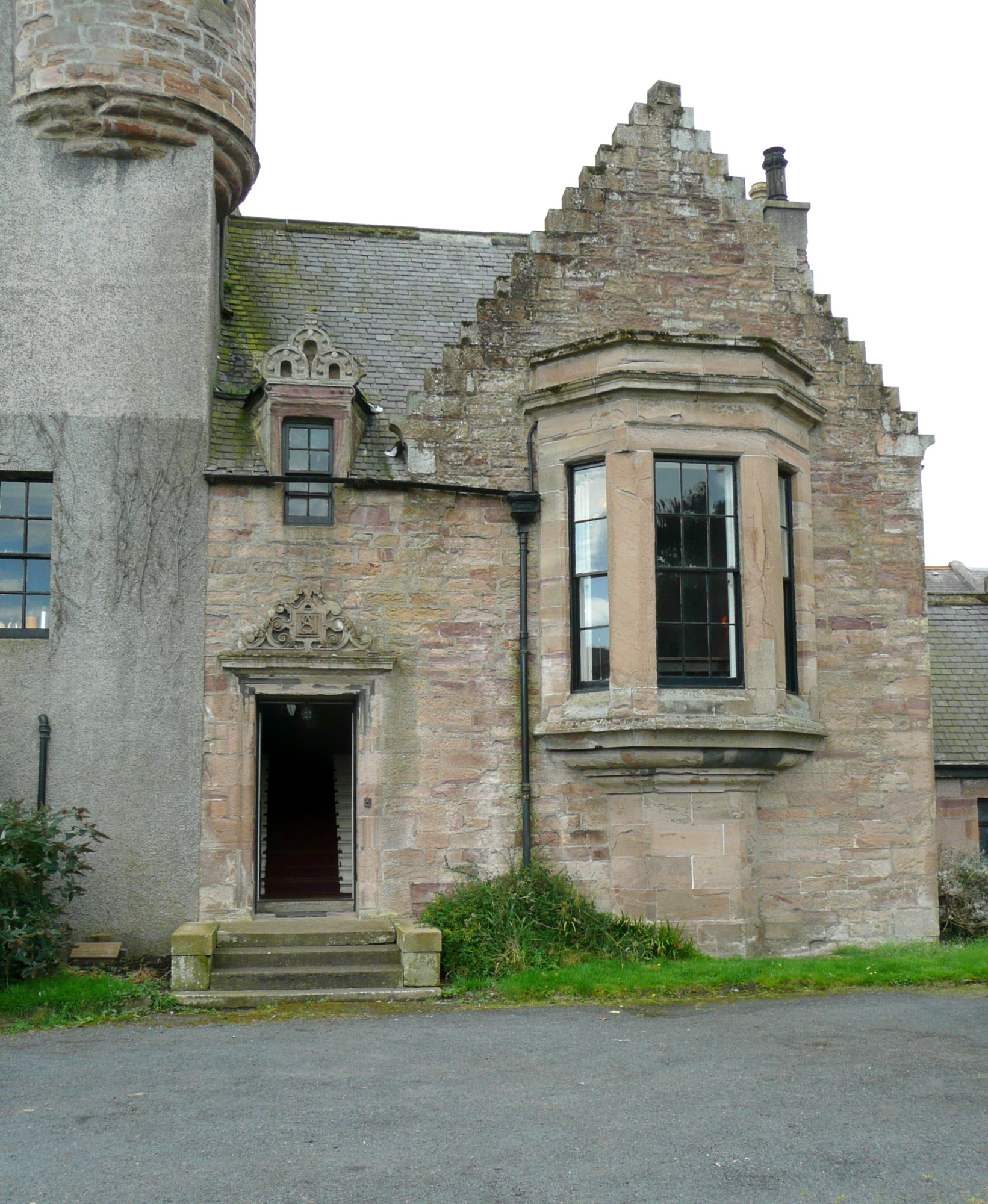
The Victorian extension to Maybole Castle

=== 21st century ===
The castle is still thought to be the oldest inhabited dwelling in Maybole, and is part of the Maybole Outstanding Conservation Area, which includes a number of other listed buildings and green spaces. It was added to the Buildings at Risk Register for Scotland in 2009, and the Maybole Castle Community Trust was registered as a charity the same year to help restore it. At the time the first two floors were in use but the upper floors were vacant, and a number of maintenance issues were identified, especially regarding the roofs and water ingress issues.

In 2010, options were reviewed regarding the path forward for the castle, which included a presentation of present floor plans and a review of the physical condition of the building. A mix of both commercial and community usage was proposed for the castle, which is still owned by the Kennedy family. Strathclyde Building Preservation Trust was the project co-ordinator. Following this in 2011, a grant of £110k was announced to aid repairs of the castle through the Maybole Castle Community Trust, along with a smaller £10k grant to cover surveying and reporting fees.

By 2021, Collective Architecture was contracted as a conservation accredited adviser and further £729k of funding from the Scottish Government Regeneration Capital Grant Fund was announced for renovations, as part of a wider Maybole regeneration scheme. Mark Fletcher, Chair of Maybole Community Council, was quoted as saying "This generous grant from Scottish Government secures a sustainable future for the castle. It's an iconic building in the town and we can now look forward to a fully revitalised high street that will make Maybole an even better town to live, work and visit." Work is expected to start late 2022 and take up to 14 months.

== See also ==
- Clan Kennedy
