= The Ballad of Captain Kidd =

English song

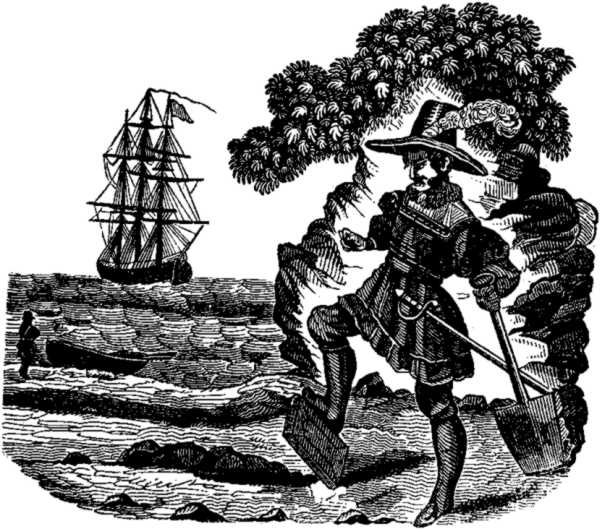
Captain Kidd burying the Bible (1837)

"The Ballad of Captain Kidd" (or simply, "Captain Kidd") is an English song about Captain William Kidd, who was executed for piracy in London on May 23, 1701. It is listed as number 1900 in the Roud Folk Song Index.

The song was printed in Britain in 1701, and it traveled to the colonies "almost immediately".

Washington Irving's 1824 work Tales of a Traveller makes mention of the song:

"There 's a fine old song about him, all to the tune of —

My name is Captain Kidd,
As I sailed, as I sailed—

And then it tells all about how he gained the Devil's good graces by burying the Bible :

I had the Bible in my hand,
As I sailed, as I sailed,
And I buried it in the sand
As I sailed. —

The song survived in the oral tradition long enough for it to be recorded from traditional singers. Bob Roberts of Dorset, England was recorded singing the song by Peter Kennedy in 1960, whilst Helen Creighton, Edith Fowke and Helen Hartness Flanders recorded several versions in Canada and New England.

The rhyme structure has been used in many folk songs including The Diggers' Song, Ye Jacobites by Name, My Love's in Germany, "What Wondrous Love Is This" "Sam Hall" and Davy Lowston.

== Selected recordings ==
- "Captain Kidd" by Alex Campbell on Alex Campbell Sings Folk, 1964.
- "Captain Kidd" by Eddie Trinkett and Howie Mitchell on Golden Ring: A Gathering of Friends for Making Music, Folk-Legacy Records, 1964.
- "Ye Jacobites by Name" by Owen Hand on I Loved a Lass, Transatlantic, 1966 (re-released with Something New on Pier Records, 1999).
- "Captain Kidd" by Waterson:Carthy on Fishes and Fine Yellow Sand, Topic Records, 2004.
- "Captain Kidd" by Tempest on The Double-Cross, Magna Carta Records, 2006.
- "Sam Hall" by May Kennedy McCord, 1960, and by Roy "Wrinkle" Winkler, 1969, Max Hunter song collection.
- "Captain Kidd" by Hughie Jones on Maritime Miscellany, Fellside Recordings.
- "Captain Kidd" by Great Big Sea on The Hard and the Easy, Warner Music Canada, 2005.

== In Mormonism ==
The song was reportedly a childhood favorite of Mormonism founder Joseph Smith.

== In Methodism ==
In 1830, the song was included in a book of Methodist camp meeting hymns, "New and Improved Camp Meeting Hymn Book," retitled as "How Precious is the Name" and featuring new lyrics.

== In popular culture ==
The song was adapted for the TV science fiction series The Expanse as "The Ballad of Captain Ashford", a song the character Klaes Ashford (played by David Strathairn) sings bits of throughout the fourth season.

The melody is part of the soundtrack for the TV show Black Sails.

It's a shantie in the 2013 video game Assassin's Creed “Black Flag”, sung by protagonist Edward Kenway's Crew
