= Margaret Kennedy, Countess of Cassilis =

Scottish aristocrat, died 1580

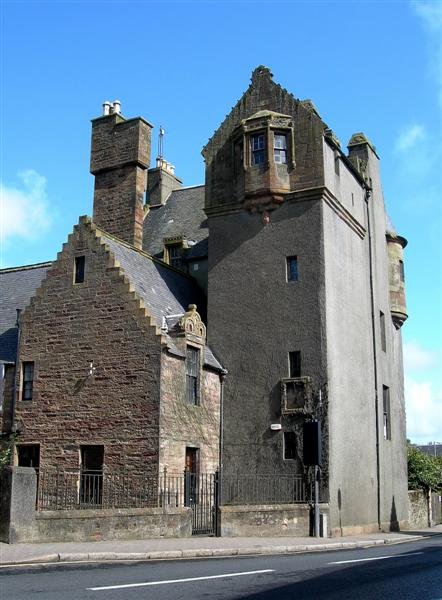
Margaret Kennedy lived at Maybole Castle.

Margaret Kennedy, Countess of Cassillis (died 1580) was a Scottish aristocrat.

== Family ==
She was a daughter of Alexander Kennedy. Her first husband was Hugh or John Wallace of Craigie. According to some sources, their daughter, Margaret Wallace, married Alan Cathcart, 4th Lord Cathcart. She had two sons, the Laird of Craigie and William Wallace of Failford.

In 1540 she married Gilbert Kennedy, 3rd Earl of Cassillis (1515–1558). Their children included:

- Katherine Kennedy, who married Patrick Vans of Barnbarroch.
- Gilbert Kennedy, 4th Earl of Cassillis (died 1576)
- Thomas Kennedy of Culzean, Master of Cassillis (died 1602), who joined the court of James VI as a gentleman of the bedchamber in October 1580.
- Jean Kennedy, who married Robert Stewart, 1st Earl of Orkney in 1561.
- Isobel Kennedy (1542–1598), who married Patrick McElwain of Thomaston

The Countess of Cassillis is said to have had a relationship with her contemporary John Faa, a leader of the gypsies. The story is told in a ballad, The Raggle Taggle Gypsy, including in some versions the execution of John Faa at the dule tree of the Place of Cassillis. A later countess, Jean Hamilton, wife of John Kennedy, 6th Earl of Cassillis is also suggested as the subject of the ballad.

== Widow's income ==
Craigmulloch hill, near Straiton, South Ayrshire

Loch Doon, South Ayrshire

After the death of her second husband, her son, now Earl of Cassillis, granted her the Place of Cassillis with its gardens and orchard as a residence (Cassilli House, between Maybole and Dalrymple), with a third part of the meadow of Blairbowie as her terce or widow's portion. A second gift was a grant of a rental from the lands of Craigmalloch (near Loch Doon castle) and livestock on the lands of Kerry Castle, and pasturing in the Forest of Buchan (in the parish of Kells). He also gave (or returned to) his mother silver plate, with furnishings including a bed hung with black velvet and black damask curtains, and four pieces of tapestry which were in the family house in Edinburgh.

In January 1576 she heard that her son by her first marriage, the Laird of Craigie, was negotiating to sell the lands of Ferstoun to Regent Morton. She was the rightful owner of a third of this property in her lifetime, and she instructed her son-in-law, Patrick Vaus to discuss her rights with the Regent, as her son had not yet informed her of the deal or offered any settlement to her. She also told him that George Corrie, Laird of Kelwood, had been taken from Thomastoun Castle to Craigneil near Colmonell. The Laird had been taken prisoner by her grandson Gilbert Kennedy, 4th Earl of Cassillis for withholding a valuable gold artefact or coin discovered in a barn.

== Buying luxury goods ==
In November 1578 she wrote to her daughter Katherine from Maybole Castle about some goods that she wished to be bought for her. She wanted velvet for a cloak, of the same type and pattern as her doublet and skirt. The cloak should be lined with rabbit fur, with a facing or collar of "mertrix" (marten) fur. She wanted a pair of plain bracelets with a lock or clasp, and a "tablet" or locket with a "just dyackle" in it, perhaps a sundial or compass. The locket was to contain scented "must". She could supply a pearl for it more cheaply than the £3 Scots her daughter had been quoted. She wanted a petticoat of fur. She also required an estimate for a low "laich bed" made from pine wood, and had already discussed the details of it. It should cost £3. As a postscript, the Countess added that she had seen a "rammage" velvet skirt belonging to Elizabeth Durham, the wife of the President of Session, which was the right stuff for her cloak.
