= Andrew Sharpe =

Andrew Sharpe may refer to:

- Andrew Sharpe, member of British band Steamchicken
- Andrew Sharpe, Baron Sharpe of Epsom, British politician

== See also ==
- Andrew Sharp (disambiguation)
