= Alex Kennedy =

Alex or Alec or Alexander Kennedy may refer to:

- Alexander Kennedy (martyr) (died 1539), Scottish martyr
- Alec Kennedy (1891–1959), English cricketer
- Alexander Kennedy (1847–1928), British engineer and academic
- Alexander Kennedy (physician) (1764–1827), Scottish surgeon and antiquary
- Alexander Kennedy (colonist) (1837—1936), Scottish colonist of Queensland
- Alexander Kennedy, known as Sandy Kennedy (1853—1944), Scottish footballer
- Alex Kennedy (British Army soldier), youngest British soldier to receive the Military Cross since 1945
- Alex Kennedy (footballer) (1893–1985), Australian footballer
- Alex Kennedy (rower) (born 1992), New Zealand rower
- Alex Kennedy (racing driver) (born 1992), American stock car racing driver
