= St Augustine's High School, Redditch =

St Augustine's Catholic High School and Sixth Form

Location
- Stonepits Lane, Hunt End; Redditch, Worcestershire, B97 5LX; England; 52°16′31″N 1°56′39″W

Information
- Type: Academy
- Religious affiliation: Roman Catholic
- Established: 1974
- Department for Education URN: 141063 Tables
- Ofsted: Reports
- Principal: Luke Payton
- Gender: Mixed
- Age: 13 to 19
- Enrolment: 945
- Sixth form students: 250
- Website: http://www.st-augustines.worcs.sch.uk/

Saint Augustine's Catholic High School and Sixth Form is a Catholic High School in Hunt End in the town of Redditch, Worcestershire, England. The school was opened in 1974. The school converted to academy status on 1 July 2014.

The school is part of the three tier system, serving as the High School stage, teaching children from the ages of 13–18 (Yr9 to Yr13). In 2019, 77% of the Year 11 students achieved 5 or more standard passes at GCSE, including Mathematics and English. 88% of students achieved a standard pass in English (grade 4) whilst 75% achieved a strong pass (grade 5). 81% of students gained a standard pass in Mathematics (grade 4) and 64% a strong pass (grade 5). Students achieved 100%, 9-4 grades in the subjects of Biology, Chemistry, Physics and Polish. 96% of Sixth Form students gained 3 or more A levels. From a cohort of 104 students, 61 A*/A grades or equivalent were gained. A May 2017 Ofsted Inspection rated the school as outstanding. A March 2019 Section 48 Inspection by the Archdiocese of Birmingham, graded the school as outstanding in all three categories of Catholic Life, Religious Education and Collective Worship.

The school has a Maths Block named 'The Canterbury Suite'. The opening was attended by the Jacqui Smith, the former MP for Redditch and former Home Secretary.

St. Augustine's is the oldest continuously operating High School in Redditch, and the name has remained unchanged since it was opened in September 1974.

== Feeder schools ==
The majority of students come from St. Bede's Catholic Middle School in the Lodge Park area of Redditch. St. Bede's is the only Catholic Middle School in Redditch. Students also come from Walkwood Middle School and Ridgeway Middle School.

== Notable former pupils ==
- James O'Neill (b. 1975) - radio presenter
- Alex Kennedy MC (b. 1991) - soldier, youngest person to be awarded the MC since the Second World War
- Jack Montgomery (b. 1992) - actor
- Jordan Adams - charity campaigner, co-Founder of The FTD Brothers
- Cian Adams - charity campaigner, co-Founder of The FTD Brothers
- Missy Goodwin (b. 2003) - footballer, Leicester City W.F.C.
