= Another Dawn =

Another Dawn may refer to:

- Another Dawn (1937 film), American film starring Errol Flynn, Kay Francis and Ian Hunter
- Another Dawn (1943 film), Mexican film starring Andrea Palma, Pedro Armendáriz and Alberto Galán
- Another Dawn (album), 2010 release by the band Tempest

== See also ==
- Always Another Dawn, 1948 Australian film starring Charles Tingwell
