= Sunken Treasures =

Studio album by Tempest
- Released: 1993
- Genre: Celtic rock
- Length: 47:21

Tempest chronology
Serrated Edge (1992)	Sunken Treasures (1993)	Surfing to Mecca (1994)

Sunken Treasures is the third release by Tempest. It is a collection of rare/demo tracks up until that point.

== Tracks ==
1. Queen of Argyll (Stewart)
2. Nottamun Town (Traditional/Tempest)
3. Milligan’s Fancy (Sørbye)
4. When Tenskwatawa Sings (Longcor)
5. Black Jack Davy (Traditional/Tempest)
6. The Creel (Traditional/Tempest) (Celtic Society’s Quickstep/The Drunken Piper)
7. And Shall Trelawney Die? (Hawker/Longcor)
8. Cat in the Corner (Sørbye)
9. Heavy Nettles (Traditional/Tempest) (Trip to Neenagh/Jenny Nettles)
10. One Last Cold Kiss (Felix Pappalardi/Gail Collins Pappalardi) (Mountain cover)
11. Baladi (Wullenjohn/Mullen)
12. The Barrow Man (Sørbye)
13. Winding Road (Sørbye)
14. The Parting Glass (Traditional/Tempest)

Album produced by Tempest with Mike Demmers, Executive Producer: Teri Lee. Assembled by Mike Demmers at Desitrek #Studios, Portland, OR. Mastered by George Horn at Fantasy Records, Berkeley, CA.

== Credits ==
- 1989 Sessions: (Tracks 1,3,5,8,9,10,12,13)
  - These tracks were first available as a self produced cassette titled Celtic Rock.
  - Engineered by Paul Carsen. Recorded at Drone Studios, Redwood City, CA.
  - Band Members: Lief Sørbye, Rob Wullenjohn, Adolfo Lazo, Mark Showalter.
- 1990 Sessions: (Track 6)
  - The missing track from the Bootleg record! Engineered by Doug Dayson.
  - Recorded at the Music Annex, Menlo Park, Ca.
  - Band Members: Lief Sorbye, Rob Wullenjohn, Adolfo Lazo, Ian Butler.
- 1991 Sessions: (Tracks 4,7, 14)
  - These songs were recorded for Michael Longcor’s Drunken Angel album.
  - Engineered by Mike Demmers. Recorded at Desitrek Studios, Portland, OR.
  - Band Members: Lief Sørbye, Rob Wullenjohn, Adolfo Lazo, Ian Butler.
- 1992 Sessions: (Tracks 2,11)
  - Recorded specially for Sunken Treasures - live digital recordings engineered by Mike Demmers. Recorded at **Desitrek Studios, Portland, OR.
  - Band Members: Lief Sørbye, Rob Wullenjohn, Adolfo Lazo, Ian Butler, Michael Mullen.
- Released by Firebird Arts and Music.
