= Drowning pit =

Small body of water used for execution

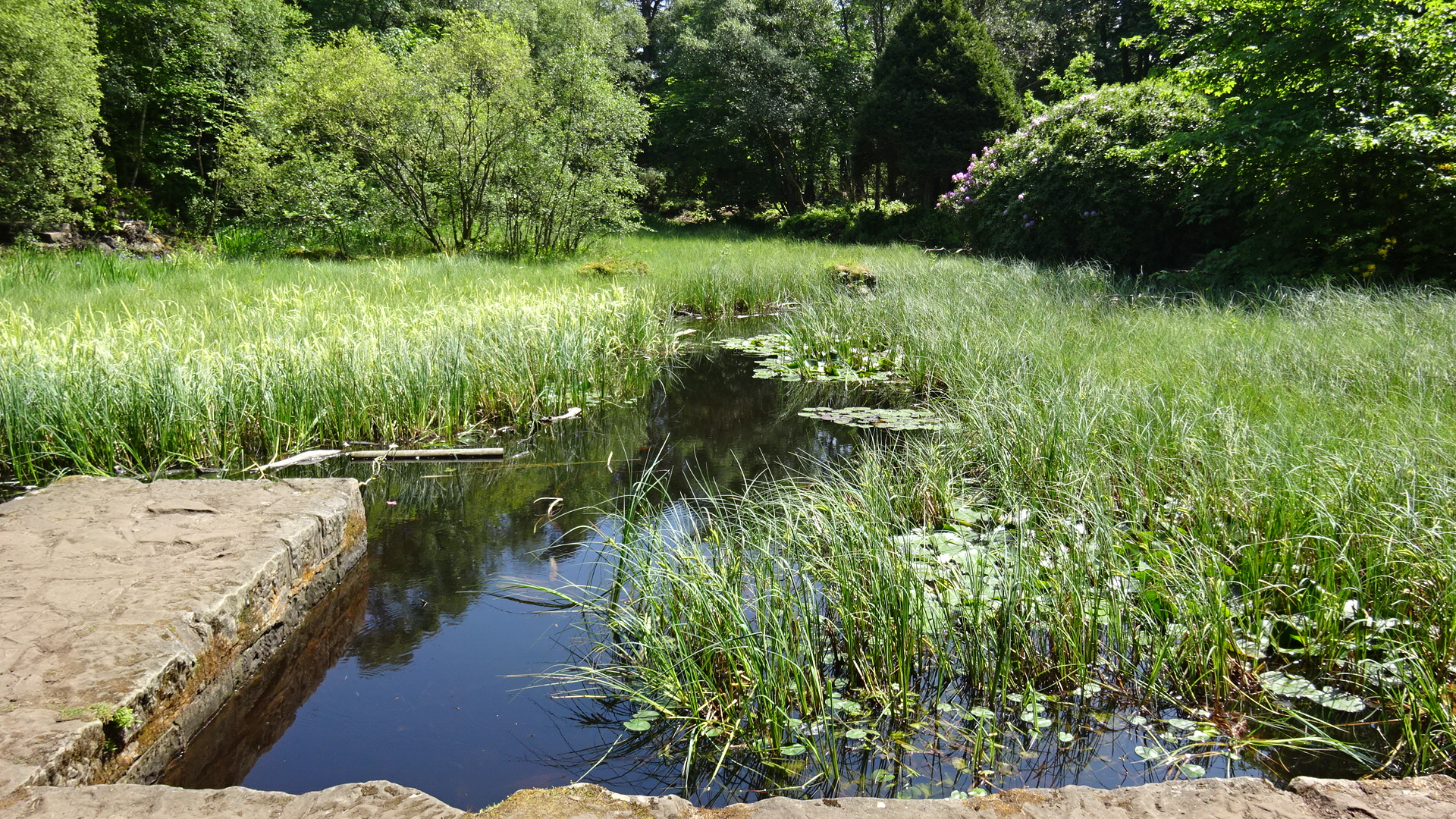
Drowning pit in Milngavie, near Mugdock Barony Court

A drowning pit, drowning pool, murder-pool or murder hole (not to be confused with defensive murder holes) was a well or pond specifically for executing women and girls (for males the dule tree or gibbet was used) under Scottish feudal laws. Rivers or lochans were used if conveniently situated near to a moot hill, where the baronial court dempster would announce the death penalty. The term fossa was also used, as in the phrase furca and fossa.

== Introduction ==
Drowning pits came into legal use after it was enacted, at the parliament assembled in Forfar in 1057 by King Malcolm Canmore, that every baron should sink a well or pit for the drowning of women. The term murder hole sometimes relates to these formal drowning sites. Bones have been found close to some of these sites, suggesting that the corpses were buried close by and not in hallowed ground.

Some drowning pits had ladders down which the condemned person had to climb; the ladder was then withdrawn. At other sites hurdles were used to hold the condemned woman below the water. Many moot hill sites are or were surrounded by water or were situated at the edge of a body of water, such as Mugdock, Mound Wood near Auchentiber, the Court Hill at the Hill of Beith, and Hutt Knowe at Bonshaw. Some accounts mention the victim having a stone tied around her neck, or being tied up in a sack and dropped into the pool.

It is not clear why men were more likely to be hanged and women drowned in a fen, river, pit, or murder hole. However, it may relate to ideas of decency or because it was a less violent death.

== Feudal jurisdiction ==
The binomial expression pit and gallows or – reversing the terms – furca and fossa refers to the high justice rights of a feudal baron, including capital punishment. The right is described in full as pit and gallows, sake and soke, toll and team, and infangthief.

With the introduction of the feudal system to Scotland in the 12th-century, the pre-feudal Celtic tenures were transformed into holdings from the Crown and a number of these were held directly or in chief of the Crown and were held in liberam baroniam ('free barony'), with the aforementioned high justice (with pit and gallows). It is said that King Malcolm Canmore legislated in 1057 that every barony was to have a tree for hanging convicted men and a pit of water for the execution of convicted women.

Although drowning was generally reserved for females, being the least brutal form of death penalty, at times a male was executed in this way as a matter of favour, for instance in 1526 a man convicted of theft and sacrilege was ordered to be drowned "by the queen's special grace", and in 1611 a man was drowned at Edinburgh for stealing a lamb.

The hereditary right of high justice survived until 1747, when it was removed from the barons and from the holders of regalities and sheriffdoms by the Heritable Jurisdictions (Scotland) Act 1746. The death penalty had largely fallen into disuse by barons well before it was abolished, and its last use in Scotland may have been in 1685, the year of the drowning of the Wigtown Martyrs.

== Examples in Scotland ==
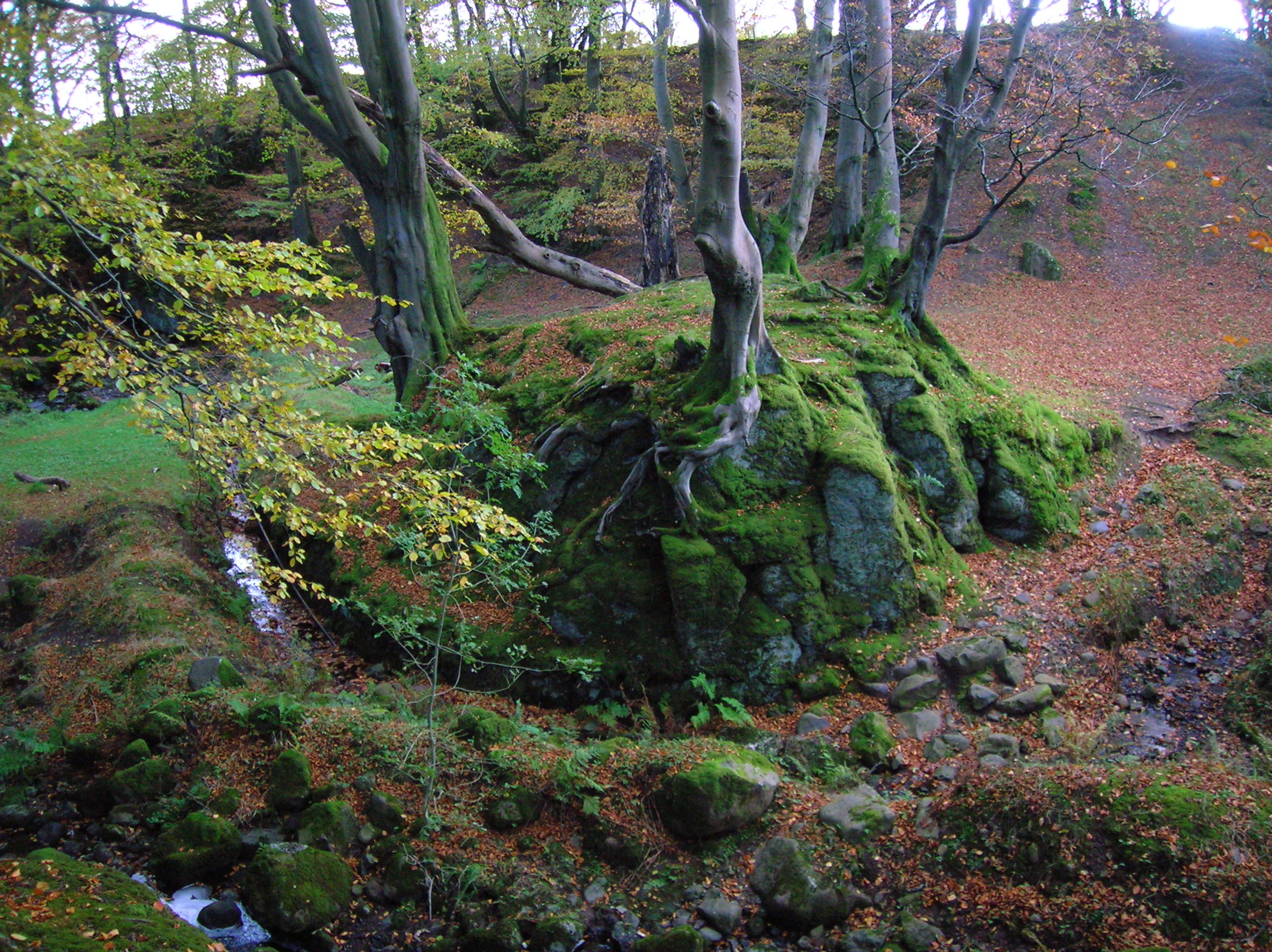
The moot hill of Giffordland with burn and pool site

These pits were often close to the residence of the baron or clan chief, and many gallows sites were close to water. (Note: Shown by Ordnance Survey maps) A pit or ditch therefore generally did not have to be constructed, making actual drowning pits rare features within the physical landscape. It is not clear what the ratio of male-to-female deaths was in feudal times. Many gallows sites are also associated with the discovery of bones; however records do not clearly state the sex.

Gallows Hill, in the parish of Cruden, was where criminals were executed and where human skeletons have been found. A deep pool in the Water of Cruden opposite is where others were drowned.

There was a drowning pool at Balliemore, Strathspey, south-east of Inverness, where it is said that witches and other women criminals used to be put to death.

Between Mugdock Castle and Craigend is a round knoll, called the moot hill. Guilty women were drowned in the small body of water which lay at the foot of the gibbet where the men were hanged.

In Straiton parish near Craigenrae is a site known as the murder hole, represented by a marshy depression. In the novel The Grey Man written by S. R. Crockett this murder hole is used, however its site is placed elsewhere.

On the Water of Minnoch is a deep pool known as the Murder Hole in which a family from Rowantree dumped their victims; they were caught, confessed and were the last to be hanged on the dule tree.

The author Joseph Train records, however, that at the last shire-mote ever held in Carrick by the Earl of Cassillis, the MacKillups of Craingenreach were hanged on the dule tree of Cassillis circa 1746, having murdered a neighbour and thrown his remains into "the common murder hole of the Bailiery at Craigenreach".

== Drowning pits elsewhere in Britain ==
The owner of Baynard's Castle, London, in the reign of John, had powers of trying criminals, and his descendants long afterwards claimed the privileges, the most valued of which was the right of drowning in the River Thames traitors taken within their jurisdiction. Drowning was the punishment ordained by Richard the Lionheart for any soldier of his army who killed a fellow crusader during the passage to the Holy Land.
