= Turn of the Wheel =

Studio album by Tempest
- Released: 1996
- Recorded: SoundTek Studios; Campbell, CA
- Genre: Celtic rock
- Length: 53:13
- Label: Magna Carta
- Producer: Robert Berry

Tempest chronology
Surfing to Mecca (1994)	Turn of the Wheel (1996)	The Gravel Walk (1997)

Professional ratings
Review scores
Source	Rating
Allmusic	3/5 stars

Turn of the Wheel is a 1996 album by Tempest. It was their first release on a major label, Magna Carta Records. It was also their first in a long string of albums produced by Robert Berry. Michael Mullen is pictured in the album artwork, but does not appear on the album (as he rejoined after it was finished).

== Tracks ==
1. The Barrow Man (Sorbye)
2. Dunmore Lassies (Traditional)
3. The Soul Cages (Sorbye/Reynolds)
4. Bogey’s Bonnie Bell (Traditional/Tempest)
5. The Midnight Sun (Sorbye)
6. Winding Road (Sorbye)
7. Bonden og Kraka (The Farmer and the Crow) (Traditional/Sorbye)
8. For the Three of Us (Williamson)
9. Nine Points of Roguery (Traditional)
10. Cat in the Corner (Sorbye)

== Credits ==
- Lief Sorbye - mandolin, vocals
- Rob Wullenjohn - guitar
- Jay Nania - bass
- Adolfo Lazo - drums
- Keith Emerson, (keyboard on track 1)
- Robert Berry - additional keyboards
- Jon Berger (acoustic and electric violins, pennywhistle on track 2),
- Chojo Jacques (violin on tracks 5,6, 8)
- Album produced by Tempest with Robert Berry.
- Vocal Production by Mike Wible and Patricia Reynolds.
- Engineered by Robert Berry and Mike Wible.
- Recorded and mixed at SoundTek Studios: Campbell, CA.
- Mastered by George Horn at Fantasy Records, Berkeley, CA.
- Released by Magna Carta.
