= John Faa =

Scottish historical character

John Faa (fl. 1540–1553), the King of the Gypsies, was a historical character from Scotland, a contemporary of King James V. Although historical sources place him in Dunbar, in the east of Scotland, much folklore associates him with the Galloway/Ayrshire border.

Johnnie Faa of Dunbar was leader of the 'Egyptians', as the gypsies were called in Scotland (Scottish Romanichal). Faa was granted a letter under the Privy Seal from King James V in February 1540, which was renewed in 1553. It was addressed to "oure louit Johnne Faw, lord and erle of Litill Egipt" ("our beloved Johnne Faw, Lord and Earl of Little Egypt") establishing his authority over all Gypsies in Scotland and calling on all sheriffs in the country to assist him "in executione of justice upoun his company and folkis", who were to "conforme to the lawis of Egipt".

== In legend ==
Johnnie Faa is associated with the tragic tale of "The Countess and the Gypsy", a version of the ballad known as "The Raggle Taggle Gyspy". The story runs that Faa, styled King of the Gypsies, ran away with a Countess of Cassilis. Her enraged husband caught up with them at a ford over the Doon, still called the Gypsies’ Steps. He hanged Faa and his followers on a Dule Tree on a mound in front of the Castle Gate at Cassillis while his wife was forced to watch from an upstairs room. He then imprisoned her in Maybole Castle for the rest of her life. The Earl is also supposed to have built an oriel window facing the place of execution and an outside staircase decorated with carvings of the faces of her lover and his gallant band, and then married again while his wife was imprisoned.

An alternative version has it that her lover was an aristocrat who was accompanied by Gypsies who "cuist the glaumourye ower her." All of this seems to be entirely mythical; the oriel window and steps pre-date the time of the tale, the Earl was a devout Churchman unlikely to be given to bigamy. On his wife's death Cassillis wrote a touching letter referring to her as "my deir bedfellow". If she did run away with her lover she didn’t get far, as the Gypsy Steps are only a few hundred yards from the castle.

The story seems to come from the concatenation of an old ballad "Johnnie Faa" well known before the date of the tale. There are many regional versions telling a similar story, and one of which mentions Cassillis. It is believed that Johnnie Faa stayed in the district and had a camp near Culroy Cassillis.

In about 1870 "Johnny Faa's Charter Chest" was presented to the Society of Antiquaries of Scotland. It was an oaken chest, elaborately bound with iron, and containing two pewter plates stamped with official marks bearing dates from 1600 to 1764. The gypsy family who kept it until about 1840 supposed these to be Johnny Faa's formal permission to travel about the country. In fact, it appears to be the official box and plates of the Incorporation of Pewterers of Edinburgh.

== In modern literature ==
In S. R. Crockett's The Raiders and Silver Sand, Faa is placed in south-west Scotland in the late seventeenth century, as a contemporary of Grierson of Lag during the Killing Times.

In Philip Pullman's His Dark Materials trilogy, a character called John Faa lives in the southern England of an alternative universe, as the King of the western Gyptians, a fictionalised version of the Gypsy people who live and travel in boats rather than on land.

== See also ==
- Scottish Romani and Itinerant people groups
