= The Lochmaben Harper =

Traditional song

"The Lochmaben Harper" or "The Blind Harper" is a traditional British Folk ballad (Child # 192, Roud # 85) and is one of the ballads collected by Francis Child in The English and Scottish Popular Ballads (1882–1898).

== Synopsis ==
A blind harp-player resolves to steal King Henry of England's brown horse, in some versions, as a result of a bet for substantial stakes. He tells his wife of his plans and that he needs their good grey mare to achieve them. She agrees, and tells him to leave the foal behind, as the mare will quickly return to her still suckling young. He sets off and, at Carlisle, he meets the king, who asks for a song. The harper replies that he'd rather have a stable for his mare. The king tells his stable boy to house the grey mare next to his own brown horse. Now the harper plays and sings so beautifully that he spellbinds his audience and they all fall asleep. He tiptoes out of the room, makes his way to the stable, tethers the two horses together and releases them. The good grey mare makes her way back home taking the stolen brown horse with her. When the morning comes, the harper falsely mourns the loss of his horse, saying that, as a result, her foal will die. The king tells him not to fret and makes good the harper's losses by paying him for the foal and three times the worth of the good grey mare. Thus the harper not only wins his bet but also gets handsomely remunerated for the animals that he never lost.

== Commentary ==
This is another of the songs Robert Burns came across and contributed to a Scots Musical Museum. It is one of several songs about blind harpers from all over Britain and Ireland (for example, On a Blind Harper, The Blind Harper (traditional Welsh Song), The Blind Harper of Johnson Hall, The Blind Harper of Tyrone and Lament for a Blind Harper) although Roud only indexes the one. Blind harpers crop up frequently in British folklore and one features in another Child ballad, The Cruel Sister, where he is called to play at the wedding of the surviving sister. There are a number of paintings of them including The Blind Harper of Conway (1792) by Julius Caesar Ibbetson. In fact, traditionally, a good proportion of harpists were blind and these were often the most accomplished, for example, Turlough O’Carolan from Ireland (1670–1738), Ruairidh Dall Morison from Scotland (1646–1725) and John Parry (Bardd Alaw) from Wales (1760–1765). It has been suggested that this is because blind people were encouraged to take up a musical instrument.

== Recordings ==
Many artists have recorded this song including:

- Andy Irvine live (1976)
- Nic Jones on From the Devil to a Stranger (1978)
- Jamie McMenemy on The Road to Kerrigouarch'h (1981)
- Robin Williamson on Legacy of the Scottish Harpers (1984)
- Golden Bough on The Boatman’s Daughter (1992)
- Martin Carthy & Dave Swarbrick on Life and Limb (1990)
- The Dubliners on Festival of Irish Music Vol. II (1994)
- Richard Hayes Phillips on Blessing in Disguise (1998)
- Paddy Tutty on The Roving Jewel (2000)
- Kate Rusby on Underneath The Stars (2003)
- Emily Smith on A Different Life (2005)
- Mervent on Mervent (2006)
- Jordan Tice, Andrew Marlin, & Christian Sedelmyer on Wild Rose of Morning (2024)

== Lyrics ==
The Lochmaben Harper

There was a jolly harper-man,
That harped aye frae toun to toun;
A wager he made, with two knights he laid
To steal King Henry's Wanton Brown.

Sir Roger he wagered five ploughs o land,
Sir Charles wagered five thousand pound,
And John he's taen the deed in hand,
To steal King Henry's Wanton Brown.

He's taen his harp into his hand,
And he gaed harping thro the toun,
And as the king in his palace sat,
His ear was touched wi the sound.

'Come in, come in, ye harper-man,
Some o your harping let me hear;'
'Indeed, my liege, and by your grace,
I'd rather hae stabling to my mare.'

'Ye'll gang to yon outer court,
That stands a little below the toun;
Ye'll find a stable snug and neat,
Where stands my stately Wanton Brown.'

He's down him to the outer court,
That stood a little below the toun;
There found a stable snug and neat,
For stately stood the Wanton Brown.

Then he has fixd a good strong cord
Unto his grey mare's bridle-rein,
And tied it unto that steed's tail,
Syne shut the stable-door behin.

Then he harped on, and he carped on,
Till all were fast asleep;
Then down thro bower and ha he's gone,
Even on his hands and feet.

He's to yon stable snug and neat,
That lay a little below the toun;
For there he placed his ain grey mare,
Alang wi Henry's Wanton Brown.

'Ye'll do you down thro mire and moss,
Thro mony bog and lairy hole;
But never miss your Wanton slack;
Ye'll gang to Mayblane, to your foal.'

As soon's the door he had unshut,
The mare gaed prancing frae the town,
An at her bridle-rein was tied
Henry's statey Wanton Brown.

Then she did rin thro mire an moss,
Thro mony bog an miery hole;
But never missed her Wanton slack
Till she reached Mayblane, to her foal.

When the king awaked from sleep
He to the harper-man did say,
O waken ye, waken ye, jolly John,
We've fairly slept till it is day.

'Win up, win up, ye harper-man,
Some mair o harping ye'll gie me:'
He said, My liege, wi a' my heart,
But first my gude grey mare maun see.

Then forth he ran, and in he came,
Dropping mony a feigned tear:
'Some rogue[s] hae broke the outer court,
An stown awa my gude grey mare.'

'Then by my sooth,' the king replied,
'If there's been rogues into the toun,
I fear, as well as your grey mare,
Awa is my stately Wanton Brown.'

'My loss is great,' the harper said,
'My loss is twice as great, I fear;
In Scotland I lost a gude grey steed,
An here I've lost a gude grey mare.'

'Come on, come on, ye harper-man,
Some o your music lat me hear;
Well paid ye'se be, John, for the same,
An likewise for your gude grey mare.'

When that John his money received,
Then he went harping frae the toun,
But little did King Henry ken
He'd stown awa his Wanton Brown.

The knights then lay ower castle-wa,
An they beheld baith dale an down,
An saw the jolly harper-man
Come harping on to Striveling toun.

Then, 'By my sooth,' Sir Roger said,
'Are ye returned to toun?
Idoubt my lad ye hae ill sped
Of stealing o the Wanton Brown.'

'I hae been into fair England,
An even into Lunan toun,
An in King Henry's outer court,
An stown awa the Wanton Brown.'

'Ye lie, ye lie,' Sir Charles he said,
'An aye sae loud's I hear ye lie;
Twall armed men, in armour bright,
They guard the stable night and day.'

'But I did harp them all asleep,
An managed my business cunninglie;
If ye make light o what I say,
Come to my stable an ye'll see.

'My music pleasd the king sae well
Mair o my harping he wishd to hear;
An for the same he paid me well,
And also for my gude grey mare.'

Then he drew out a gude lang purse,
Well stored wi gowd an white monie,
An in a short time after this
The Wanton Brown he lat them see.

Sir Roger produced his ploughs o land,
Sir Charles produced his thousand pounds,
Then back to Henry, the English king,
Restored the stately Wanton Brown.
