= Golden Bough (band) =

Golden Bough is a Celtic-music band formed in 1980 and based in California. The band performs at music festivals and has toured Europe several times. They are known for their acoustic musical performances of folk music and Celtic music and for their 22 albums. They are also known for their association with Lief Sørbye (a founding member) and with the band Tempest.

Current members of the band include Margie Butler (lyric soprano) on vocals, Celtic harp, penny whistle, recorder, bodhran and guitar; Paul Espinoza (folk tenor) on vocals, guitar, accordion and octave-mandolin; Kathy Sierra (folk soprano) on vocals, violin and viola.

== Band origins ==
The band came about after some friends attended a series of concerts at the Cannery at Fisherman's Wharf in San Francisco. The founders were Margie Butler, Margot Duxler, Lief Sørbye, and Paul Espinoza. Simon Spaulding also performed with them in the first lineup. Other artists who have been members include Florie Brown (violinist), Richard Ferry (flutist), Alison Bailey (fiddler), and Sue Draheim (violinist).

== Music ==
The band describes their music as "rooted in" the traditional music of Ireland, Scotland, Wales, Cornwall, The Isle of Man, French Brittany and Spanish Galicia. The group creates its own arrangements of the songs, giving them "a sound unique unto themselves." Along with traditional works they have mined such singers as Eric Bogle (Green Fields of France), Archie Fisher (Witch of the Westmorelands) and Jamie McMenemy's setting of The Blind Harper of Lochmaben. They also perform their own original compositions.

Some examples of songs they sing include: Red is the Rose, The Sea Queen of Connemara, The Wizard, Shifty Morgan, The Tailor and the Mouse, Black is the Color of My True Love's Hair, The Rattlin' Bog, Green Grow the Rashes-O, Charlie is my Darling, My Little Boat, Black Jack Davy, The Song of the Swan Maiden, Muirsheen Durkin, Isle of Hope, Isle of Tears by Brendan Graham, and perhaps even the Turlough O'Carolan tune, Carolan's Draught.

=== Song details ===
- Black Jack Davy is a takeoff of the traditional song Black Jack Davy. It was written by Paul Espinoza and released on the Golden Bough album, The Boatman's Daughter in 1983. In the traditional song, a man pursues his wife or lover, who has run off with the Gypsy man, Black Jack Davy. In Espinoza's version, Black Jack Davy is the pursuing lover, still looking for his lady after three years. He is presented as a ghost who cannot give up his search.

== Discography ==
- 1981 Golden Bough
- 1984 Flight of Fantasy
- 1985 Winter's Dance
- 1988 Far from Home
- 1992 The Boatman's Daughter
- 1993 Kids at Heart: Celtic Songs for Children
- 1994 Winding Road
- 1994 Beyond the Shadows
- 1995 Festival of Irish Music
- 1996 Christmas in a Celtic Land
- 1998 Celtic Music from Ireland, Scotland & Brittany
- 1999 Song of the Celts
- 2001 Contemporary Songs: The Night Wind
- 2002 Songs of Scotland
- 2004 Songs of the Irish Immigrants
- 2006 Golden Bough Live
- 2007 Celtic Folk Songs
- 2008 Pirate Gold
- 2008 Jug of Punch: Popular Irish Pub Songs
- 2009 Celtic Love Songs
- 2010 Celtic Christmas Songs
- 2010 When Winter Comes
- 2011 Down by the Greenwood
- 2014 Songs My Father Sang
- 2017 Celtic Festival
