= Look Both Ways (album) =

Studio album by Steamchicken
- Released: 10 March 2017
- Genre: Jazz, roots, ceilidh, dance
- Label: Chicken Records STEAM16/3

Steamchicken chronology
20 Years (2013)	Look Both Ways (2017)

Singles from Look Both Ways
- 1. "When I Get Low I Get High" Released: 5 November 2016; 2. "Gypsy" Released: 9 December 2016

Professional ratings
Review scores
Source	Rating
Music Republic magazine	4/5 stars
Pure M magazine	4/5 stars

Look Both Ways is an album by Steamchicken, and their first with lead vocalist Amy Kakoura. It was released on 10 March 2017.

== Reception ==
James Miller, in the Morning Star, described Look Both Ways as "a thunderous jazz-folk-soul concoction that cries out to be blasted out loud through open windows on a hot summer’s evening". Dave Beeby, reviewing the album for The Living Tradition magazine, said that it had confounded his expectations. In using a full brass section and a driving rhythm section, Steamchicken had moved beyond providing a collection of ceilidh dance tunes to showcasing tracks that are "imaginatively arranged by the band, showing varied influences, from reggae to New Orleans jazz, with their dance roots showing occasionally, and the amazing vocal range of Amy [Kakoura] handling everything thrown at her". Martha Buckley, for Folk Radio UK, said that Look Both Ways demonstrated Steamchicken's "knowledge of both folk and jazz, polishing traditional gems into sparkling arrangements, and adding successful original compositions to create an eminently hummable album".

Dai Jeffries, for Folking.com, described the album as "possibly the definitive statement of jazz-folk". Marc Higgins, for Northern Sky magazine, said: "From the opening call of the brass section this is an album that sticks up two fingers at our compulsion to pigeon hole. Is it jazz or folk?... Mary And The Soldier takes a Folk Ballad and turns it into a big band anthem with a groove and elasticity that Bellowhead could only dream of. It roars along, as what sounds like an accordion swirls over a reggae infused beat on a bed of big band brass stabs and choruses, till it ends on a rapid crescendo that leaves you gasping". Reviewing the album for Music Republic magazine, Simon Redley said: "British seven-piece band Steamchicken blend folk, jazz, gypsy-swing, reggae, blues, soul and the kitchen sink on their good-time album. Together for 20-odd years, this is a slightly new direction in sound for them. Their first release featuring the quite splendid Amy Kakoura on lead vocals... The humour and fun elements do not over shadow the sheer musical talent here, nor the palpable chemistry that’s in abundance across these tracks".

David Chamberlain of Fatea was impressed that "each track is not just a song but a piece of Musical Theatre". For him, "the standout track on Look Both Ways is Gypsy, an original composition that takes the story of the Raggle Taggle Gypsies and turns it around to give the Lady's point of view. The combination of the words, the sultry arrangement and Amy's voice all serve to convey the hope of a new life with her lover tinged with regret at leaving her former one, no matter how suffocating it eventually became".

Nick Hart, for Bright Young Folk, said that the band's arrangement of "Brigg Fair" and "Gypsy" "together form probably the most convincing attempt yet at marrying English folk song and ambient dubstep. This is not just down to the solidity of the rhythm section in providing down tempo but not leaden beats, but also the well-considered use of the band’s four piece horn section".

Ireland's Pure M magazine gave a 4.5-starred rating to the band's release of "Gypsy" as a single, which its reviewer, Danielle Hollon, described as having a "20th century, Great Gatsby feeling".

== Production and design ==
The album was produced by Steamchicken and recorded and mastered by John Rivers. The album sleeve, incorporating photography by Elly Lucas, was designed by Mandy Sutton and Amy Kakoura.

== Track listing ==
1. "Jericho" – 3:28
2. "Brigg Fair" (Roud 1083) – 2:54
3. "When I Get Low I Get High" – 2:54
4. "Western Approaches" – 4:46
5. "Gypsy" (Roud 1; Child 200; G/D 2:278) – 5:29
6. "Oh Mary" (Roud 11823) – 4:08
7. "Big Tin Horn" – 2:57
8. "Foot Falling" – 4:05
9. "Mary and the Soldier" (Roud 2496; G/D 1:91) – 3:26

== Personnel ==
- Amy Kakoura – vocals
- Andrew Sharpe – piano, keyboards
- Becky Eden-Green – alto saxophone, clarinet, bass
- Joe Crum – percussion
- Katy Oliver – trumpet
- Mandy Sutton – tenor saxophone
- Matt Crum – soprano saxophone, melodeon, synthesiser
- Ted Crum – harmonica, bass, melodeon
