= Jack Montgomery (actor) =

- Born: 17 February 1992 (age 33); Alvechurch, Worcestershire, England
- Occupation: Actor

Jack Montgomery (born 17 February 1992) is a British actor and singer, who has appeared in television, stage productions and films.

He studied at St Augustine's High School, Redditch. He portrayed Jeremy Potts in Chitty Chitty Bang Bang at the London Palladium and he was also part of the original cast of Mary Poppins in which he played Michael Banks. He returned to the London Palladium to play "Kurt von Trapp" in the 2006 London revival of The Sound of Music.

He appeared as young Simon in Tristan & Isolde (2006) and The Christmas Miracle of Jonathan Toomey (2007).

Television roles include appearances in Blue Peter, Primeval, BBC's "Celebrate Oliver!" presented by Shane Richie (broadcast on 26 December 2005) and a guest role on the soap Doctors. He has also appeared in the fifth and thirteenth episodes of the second season of Torchwood in 2008, as a younger version of protagonist Captain Jack Harkness.

In 2008 Montgomery played Peter Pan at the Grand Theatre, Wolverhampton.

== Sources ==
- Jack Montgomery's resume at agency's website (Retrieved 1 June 2007)
