= Prime Cuts (Tempest album) =

Compilation album by Tempest
- Released: 2008
- Genre: Celtic, folk, progressive rock
- Label: Magna Carta

Tempest chronology
Lief's Birthday Bash Party (2007)	Prime Cuts (2008)	Another Dawn (2010)

Prime Cuts is a 2008 album by Tempest. It is a compilation album including both previous releases and new songs. It is released by Magna Carta. It features a CD and a DVD.

== Tracks ==
1. "Byker Hill" – 3:10
2. "Captain Morgan" – 4:40
3. "Cabar Feidh" – 3:11
4. "One for the Fiddler" – 3:30
5. "Wicked Spring" – 3:50
6. "Green Grow the Rashes" – 4:37
7. "Lady Howard’s Walk" – 3:42
8. "The Serb" (intro) – 1:55
9. "The Serb (Keep On Moving)" – 4:09
10. "Catalina Island" – 4:07
11. "Whoever You Are" – 4:09
12. "Queen of Argyll" – 4:18
13. "Dance of the Sandwitches" – 4:19
14. "The Barrow Man" – 4:52
15. "The Karfluki Set" – 7:02
16. "You Jacobites By Name" – 4:13
17. "Catalina Remix" – 4:34
18. "Locomotive Breath" – 4:32
