= The Gravel Walk =

Studio album by Tempest
- Released: 1997
- Genre: Celtic rock
- Length: 50:49
- Label: Magna Carta
- Producer: Tempest with Robert Berry

Tempest chronology
Turn of the Wheel (1996)	The Gravel Walk (1997)	The 10th Anniversary Compilation (1998)

Professional ratings
Review scores
Source	Rating
Allmusic	4/5 stars

The Gravel Walk is a 1997 album by Tempest.

== Tracks ==
1. One for the Fiddler (Sorbye)
2. Buffalo Jump (MacLean)
3. Bonnie Lass of Anglesey (Wullenjohn/Traditional)
4. Green Grow the Rashes (Traditional)
5. Flowers of Red Hill (Traditional)
6. Sinclair (Traditional)
7. Plains of Kildare (Traditional)
8. Trip Across the Mountain (Sorbye/Traditional)
9. Broken Ring (Sorbye/Reynolds)
10. The Karfluki Set

== Credits ==
- Lief Sorbye - mandolin, vocals
- Rob Wullenjohn - guitar
- Jay Nania - bass/12 string bass
- Adolfo Lazo - drums
- Michael Mullen - fiddle
- Robert Berry - additional keyboards
- Album produced by Tempest with Robert Berry.
- Vocal Production by Mike Wible and Patricia Reynolds.
- Released by Magna Carta.
