= Bootleg (Tempest album) =

Studio album by Tempest
- Released: 1991
- Studio: The Music Annex; Dave Wellhausen Studios; San Francisco, California
- Genre: Celtic rock
- Length: 38:55
- Label: Heyday
- Producer: Tempest with Doug Dayson and John Altman

Tempest chronology
Bootleg (1991)	Serrated Edge (1992)

Professional ratings
Review scores
Source	Rating
Allmusic	4/5 stars

Bootleg is the debut album by Tempest. At the time, they did not have a fiddle player, and performed as a four-piece.

== Track listing ==
1. Heather on the Moor (Traditional/Tempest)
2. Soldier Song (Wullenjohn)
3. Handsome Molly (Traditional/Tempest)
4. Wild Rover (Wullenjohn/Traditional)
5. Desert Eyes (Butler)
6. Captain Morgan (Sorbye)
7. Same Side of the Fence (Sorbye/Butler)
8. Dance of the Third Leg (Wullenjohn)
9. Heart of Mine (Sorbye)
10. Man Without a Name (Butler)

== Personnel ==
- Lief Sorbye – mandolin, vocals
- Rob Wullenjohn – guitar
- Adolfo Lazo – drums
- Ian Butler – bass
- Danny Carnahan – fiddle
- Album produced by Tempest with Doug Dayson and John Altman.
- Recorded at The Music Annex and Dave Wellhausen Studios, San Francisco, California.
- Engineered by John Altmann and Doug Dayson.
- Mastered by George Horn at Fantasy Studios, Berkeley, California.
- Released by Heyday Records.
