= Serrated Edge =

Studio album by Tempest
- Released: 1992
- Recorded: Desitrek Studios Portland, OR; May 1992
- Genre: Celtic rock
- Length: 42:23
- Label: Beacon
- Producer: Tempest with Mike Demmers

Tempest chronology
Bootleg (1991)	Serrated Edge (1992)	Sunken Treasures (1993)

Professional ratings
Review scores
Source	Rating
Allmusic	4.5/5 stars

Serrated Edge is the second album by Tempest. It was their first with a fiddler, and was released in 1992.

== Tracks ==
1. Hal-an Tow (Traditional)
2. Raggle Taggle Gypsy (Traditional)
3. A Kiss in the Morning Early (Traditional)
4. Reels on Fire (Traditional) (Heather Bell/Monaghan Twig/Wind That Shakes the Barley)
5. The House Carpenter (Traditional)
6. Whiskey in the Jar (Traditional)
7. Dark Lover (Love Song to a Vampire) (Mercedes Lackey/Sorbye)
8. Tam Lin (Traditional)
9. Mad Tom of Bedlam (Traditional)
10. The Ballydesmond Set (Traditional) (Ballydesmond/Born to Run (Sorbye)/Bill Sullivan's)

== Credits ==
- Lief Sorbye - mandolin, vocals
- Rob Wullenjohn - guitar
- Adolfo Lazo - drums
- Ian Butler - bass
- Michael Mullen - fiddle
- Album produced by Tempest with Mike Demmers,
- Executive Producer: Teri Lee. Recorded at Desitrek Studios, Portland, OR, May 1992. *Engineered by Mike Demmers. Mastered by George Horn at Fantasy Records, Berkeley, CA.

First released by Beacon Records.
