= Alex Kennedy (footballer) =

Australian rules footballer

Personal information
- Full name: Alexander McCree Kennedy
- Born: 11 January 1893; Nathalia, Victoria
- Died: 20 June 1985 (aged 92); St Kilda East, Victoria
- Height: 169 cm (5 ft 7 in)

Playing career^{1}
| Years | Club | Games (Goals) |
| 1917–1918 | Fitzroy | 9 (2) |
- ^{1} Playing statistics correct to the end of 1918.

Alexander McCree Kennedy (11 January 1893 – 20 June 1985) was an Australian rules footballer who played for the Fitzroy Football Club in the Victorian Football League (VFL).
