= The Double-Cross =

Studio album by Tempest
- Released: 2006
- Genre: Celtic rock, folk, progressive rock

Tempest chronology
| 15th Anniversary Collection Box Set (2004) | The Double-Cross (2006) | Lief's Birthday Bash (2007) |

The Double-Cross is an album by Tempest, released in 2006.

== Tracks ==
1. "Captain Kidd" (Sorbye/Reynolds)
2. "Slippery Slide" (Mullen)
3. "Hangman" (Sorbye/Traditional)
4. "Black Eddy" (Sorbye/Traditional)
5. "Whoever You Are" (Sorbye/Reynolds)
6. "Vision Quest" (Cap/Wein)
7. "Per Spelmann" (Sorbye/Traditional)
8. "Cabar Feidh" (Traditional)
9. "Eppy Moray" (Traditional)
10. "Wizard's Walk" (Traditional/Ungar/Morrison)

== Credits ==
- Lief Sorbye - mandolin, vocals
- Ronan Carroll - guitar
- Adolfo Lazo - drums
- Michael Mullen - fiddle
- Ariane Cap - bass
- Robert Berry - additional keyboards
- Album produced by Tempest with Robert Berry.
- Vocal Production by Mike Wible and Patricia Reynolds.
- Released by Magna Carta.
