= Andrew Sharp =

Andrew Sharp may refer to:

- Andrew Sharp (trade unionist) (1841–1919), British trade unionist
- Andrew Peacock, also known as Andrew Sharp Peacock, (1939-2021), Australian politician
