= Another Dawn (album) =

Studio album by Tempest
- Released: 2010
- Genres: Progressive rock, folk
- Length: 46:59
- Label: Magna Carta

Tempest chronology
Prime Cuts (2008)	Another Dawn (2010)	The Tracks We Leave (2015)

Another Dawn is a 2010 album by the Southern California-based American Celtic rock band Tempest.

== Critical reception ==
Professional ratings
Review scores
Source	Rating
AllMusic	3.5/5 stars

AllMusic gave the album a positive review saying that Tempest had successfully "reinvent[ed] themselves by blending contemporary and traditional sounds."

== Track listing ==
No.	Title	Composer	Length
1.	"Let's Live for Today"	Shapiro	3:31
2.	"Verses of Grace"	Crocker, Sorbye	4:29
3.	"The New Squire"	Crocker	5:55
4.	"Great Departure"	Sorbye	4:5
5.	"Never Tire of the Road"		3:50
6.	"Jomfru"	Sorbye, Traditional	6:28
7.	"Dagda's Harp"	Crocker, Traditional	6:07
8.	"The Moving-on Song"	MacColl	3:16
9.	"Black Jack Davy"	Sorbye, Traditional	3:11
10.	"High Rise"	Crocker, Traditional	6:7
Total length:			46:59
