= Tempest (Celtic rock band) =

American Celtic rock band

Tempest is an American Celtic rock band from the San Francisco Bay Area, based in Oakland, California. They fuse the traditional Celtic music with Norwegian and European folk, American folk, and progressive rock.

== History ==
The band formed in 1988 with Lief Sørbye (mandolin, vocals), Adolfo Lazo (drums), Rob Wullenjohn (guitar), and Mark Showalter (bass). The band has seen a changing cast of musicians, with Sørbye and Lazo being the only two constant members throughout the duration of the band's existence.

The current lineup consists of Lief Sørbye (mandolin, vocals), Adolfo Lazo (percussion), and returning former members; Rob Wullenjohn (guitar), Jon Berger (fiddle) and Ian Butler (bass). Lief is from Oslo, Norway and Adolfo Lazo from Havana, Cuba, while current members Rob, Jon and Ian are from the United States. In 2010, Tempest released Another Dawn - it was Tempest's 11th full-length studio album. In 2006, Tempest released their 10th full-length studio album, entitled The Double-Cross. In 2007, the band released a live CD, entitled Lief's Birthday Bash. The Birthday Bash CD was recorded on the evening of 23 March 2007 at Ashkenaz Dance Community Center in Berkeley, and features tracks including a number of musicians that Lief has played with over the years: both past Tempest members and some members of Golden Bough as well. Much of the recent live CD is actually acoustic. In 2022 the band released the CD Going Home, their first album after leaving Magna Carta records. It was released on Celtidelic Records, and engineered by Robert Berry at Berry's Soundtek Studios.

The band has held the honor of being invited to play a number of times at the Philadelphia Folk Festival and they also host an eclectic music and arts festival of their own, in Auburn, California, on the first weekend of May each year. The festival is called Karfluki Fest, and has featured such artists as It's A Beautiful Day, Big Brother and the Holding Company, Fairport Convention, Shana Morrison, Wicked Tinkers and Fishtank Ensemble, in addition to an array of side show acts such as belly dancers, a sword swallower, jugglers, acrobats and fire dancers.

== Other projects ==
Frontman Lief Sørbye occasionally plays in an acoustic Celtic folk duo called Caliban, usually joined by a current or former Tempest fiddler, such as Kathy Buys, Michael Mullen, or Sue Draheim. They have released one self-titled recording and often do shows during Tempest tours. Lief Sørbye has also released two solo albums, Springdans (1987) and Across the Borders (1994). Incumbent fiddler Kathy Buys was the fiddler with a world fusion band called The Druid Sisters Tea Party. Former bassist John Land was previously in a band called Coyote Pudding. They had one release, titled Joking, Drunk, or Bored as Hell.

== Personnel ==
=== Members ===
==== Current members ====
- Adolfo Lazo - drums (1988–present)
- Lief Sørbye - vocals, mandolin (1988–present)
- Jon Berger - fiddle (1993–present)
- Rob Wullenjohn - guitar (1988–present)
- Ian Butler - bass (1989–present)

==== Former members ====
- Mark Showalter - bass (1988-1989)
- Michael Mullen - fiddle (1992-1993, 1996-2001, 2004–2012)
- Jay Nania - bass (1995-1998)
- John Land - bass (1998-2000)
- Dave Parnall - guitar (1998-1999)
- Todd Evans - guitar (1999-2002)
- Darren Cassidy - bass (2000-2001)
- Jim "Hurricane" Hurley - fiddle (2001-2002)
- William Maxwell - bass (2001-2002)
- Sue Draheim - fiddle (2002-2004)
- Joel Monte Mahan - guitar (2002-2003)
- Mark Skowronek - bass (2002-2004)
- Ronan Carroll - guitar (2003-2007)
- Ariane Cap - bass (2004-2007)
- James Crocker - guitar (2007-2011)
- Damien Gonzalez - bass (2007-2011)
- Brian Fox - bass (2011-2012)
- Greg Jones - guitar (2011-2016)
- Caith Threefires - bass (2012-2013)
- Vince Lucchesi - bass (2013-2015)
- Josh Fossgreen - bass (2015-2019)
- Ab Menon - guitar (2016-2019)
- Kevin Florian - guitar (2019-2020)
- Mirco Melone - bass (2019-2021)
- Lee Corbie-Wells - fiddle (2020-2023)
- Nikolay Georgiev - guitar (2020-2023)
- Hugh Caley - bass (2021-2023)

=== Lineups ===
| 1988-1989 | 1989-1992 | 1992-1993 | 1993-1995 |
|---|---|---|---|
| Adolfo Lazo - drums; Mark Showalter - bass; Lief Sørbye - vocals, mandolin; Rob Wullenjohn - guitar | Adolfo Lazo - drums; Lief Sørbye - vocals, mandolin; Rob Wullenjohn - guitar; Ian Butler - bass | Adolfo Lazo - drums; Lief Sørbye - vocals, mandolin; Rob Wullenjohn - guitar; Ian Butler - bass; Michael Mullen - fiddle | Adolfo Lazo - drums; Lief Sørbye - vocals, mandolin; Rob Wullenjohn - guitar; Ian Butler - bass; Jon Berger - fiddle |
| 1995-1996 | 1996-1998 | 1998-1999 | 1999-2000 |
| Adolfo Lazo - drums; Lief Sørbye - vocals, mandolin; Rob Wullenjohn - guitar; Jon Berger - fiddle; Jay Nania - bass | Adolfo Lazo - drums; Lief Sørbye - vocals, mandolin; Rob Wullenjohn - guitar; Jay Nania - bass; Michael Mullen - fiddle | Adolfo Lazo - drums; Lief Sørbye - vocals, mandolin; Michael Mullen - fiddle; John Land - bass; Dave Parnall - guitar | Adolfo Lazo - drums; Lief Sørbye - vocals, mandolin; Michael Mullen - fiddle; John Land - bass; Todd Evans - guitar |
| 2000-2001 | 2001-2002 | 2002-2003 | 2003-2004 |
| Adolfo Lazo - drums; Lief Sørbye - vocals, mandolin; Michael Mullen - fiddle; Todd Evans - guitar; Darren Cassidy - bass | Adolfo Lazo - drums; Lief Sørbye - vocals, mandolin; Todd Evans - guitar; Jim "Hurricane" Hurley - fiddle; William Maxwell - bass | Adolfo Lazo - drums; Lief Sørbye - vocals, mandolin; Sue Draheim - fiddle; Joel Monte Mahan - guitar; Mark Skowronek - bass | Adolfo Lazo - drums; Lief Sørbye - vocals, mandolin; Sue Draheim - fiddle; Mark Skowronek - bass; Ronan Carroll - guitar |
| 2004–2007 | 2007–2011 | 2011-2012 | 2012–2013 |
| Adolfo Lazo - drums; Lief Sørbye - vocals, mandolin; Ronan Carroll - guitar; Ariane Cap - bass; Michael Mullen - fiddle | Adolfo Lazo - drums; Lief Sørbye - vocals, mandolin; Michael Mullen - fiddle; James Crocker - guitar; Damien Gonzalez - bass | Adolfo Lazo - drums; Lief Sørbye - vocals, mandolin; Michael Mullen - fiddle; Brian Fox - bass; Greg Jones - guitar | Adolfo Lazo - drums; Lief Sørbye - vocals, mandolin; Greg Jones - guitar; Kathy Buys - fiddle; Caith Threefires - bass |
| 2013–2015 | 2015–2016 | 2016–2019 | 2019–2020 |
| Adolfo Lazo - drums; Lief Sørbye - vocals, mandolin; Greg Jones - guitar; Kathy Buys - fiddle; Vince Lucchesi - bass | Adolfo Lazo - drums; Lief Sørbye - vocals, mandolin; Greg Jones - guitar; Kathy Buys - fiddle; Josh Fossgreen - bass | Adolfo Lazo - drums; Lief Sørbye - vocals, mandolin; Kathy Buys - fiddle; Josh Fossgreen - bass; Ab Menon - guitar | Adolfo Lazo - drums; Lief Sørbye - vocals, mandolin; Kathy Buys - fiddle; Kevin Florian - guitar; Mirco Melone - bass |
| 2020 | 2020–2021 | 2021–2023 | 2023–Present |
| Adolfo Lazo - drums; Lief Sørbye - vocals, mandolin; Kevin Florian - guitar; Mirco Melone - bass; Lee Corbie-Wells - fiddle | Adolfo Lazo - drums; Lief Sørbye - vocals, mandolin; Mirco Melone - bass; Lee Corbie-Wells - fiddle; Nikolay Georgiev - guitar | Adolfo Lazo - drums; Lief Sørbye - vocals, mandolin; Lee Corbie-Wells - fiddle; Nikolay Georgiev - guitar; Hugh Caley - bass | Adolfo Lazo - drums; Lief Sørbye - vocals, mandolin; Kathy Buys - fiddle; Rob Wullenjohn - guitar; Ian Butler - bass |

== Discography ==
Studio albums

- Bootleg (1991)
- Serrated Edge (1992)
- Surfing to Mecca (1994)
- Turn of the Wheel (1996)
- The Gravel Walk (1997)
- Balance (2001)
- Shapeshifter (2003)
- The Double-Cross (2006)
- Another Dawn (2010)
- The Tracks We Leave (2015)
- Thirty Little Turns (2018)
- Going Home (2022)

Live albums

- Live at the Philadelphia Folk Festival (2000)
- Lief's Birthday Bash Party (2007)
- Live From SoundTek Studios (2020)

Compilation albums

- Sunken Treasures (1993)
- The 10th Anniversary Compilation (1998)
- 15th Anniversary Collection Box Set (2004)
- Prime Cuts (2008)
- Live On The Air (2020)
