= Alex Kennedy (British Army soldier) =

British Army soldier

Alex Kennedy MC
- Born: 1990 or 1991 (age 35–36)
- Military career
- Allegiance: United Kingdom
- Branch: British Army
- Service years: 2008 – ?
- Rank: Lance Corporal
- Unit: Mercian Regiment
- Conflicts: War in Afghanistan

Alexander Robert Kennedy MC (born 1990 or 1991) is a serving member of the British Army and believed to be the youngest person to be awarded the Military Cross since the Second World War.

== Military career ==
Kennedy joined the Mercian Regiment, British Army in 2008. Within months of joining, he served his first tour of duty in Afghanistan with A Company, 2nd Battalion, The Mercian Regiment. He was awarded the Military Cross (MC) on 19 March 2010 "for gallant and distinguished services in Afghanistan during the period 1st April 2009 to 30th September 2009". He had to aided his injured platoon commander whilst under fire during a battle in Helmand province, Afghanistan in June 2009, when aged only 18.

On 8 June 2009, Private Kennedy was taking part in an operation to clear hostile terrain in Garmsir as point man when his group was ambushed by Taliban insurgents. Three PK machine gun machine gun positions who opened fire from 100 to 150 meters away . All together there were nine Taliban reported and Kennedy's platoon commander was shot. Running back through the machine gun fire to his commander, Kennedy lay on the floor next to him with his back facing the enemy fire to protect him from the elements. Once he had stopped the bleeding, he then started to locate the enemy positions. He took his platoon commander's radio and used it to send an accurate situation report, allowing the accompanying CVR(T) to move towards their position. Kennedy himself returned fire with his light machine gun. During this, his LMG was shot on the handle next to the rear site of his weapon as he was returning fire. Flipping him onto his back, blinding him and deafening him. Once he came to, he then carried on returning weathering fire. His covering fire allowed for Bell to be extracted and kept the Taliban engaged until the CVR(T) arrived.

By sending an accurate situation report whilst under fire, Kennedy enabled the casualty to be extracted at speed; by suppressing the enemy with accurate LMG fire, Kennedy enabled the rest of the multiple to extract from the killing area. Had this not happened, the multiple would have taken many more casualties. All this was done by a Private soldier with six months’ experience in the Army.
Kennedy acted with a level of composure and situational awareness above that expected of a Private soldier. It is for this demonstration of selfless bravery and a cool head under fire that Kennedy is highly deserving of public recognition.

— Part of his MC citation

Kennedy was invested with his medal by Charles, Prince of Wales, during a ceremony at Buckingham Palace on 9 July 2010. Bromsgrove District Council recognised Kennedy's actions in a civic reception in May 2010, where Major Bob Prophet of the 2nd Battalion Mercian Regiment (Worcesters and Foresters) read his full Military Cross citation. Kennedy then requested a minute's silence for casualties, including Private Robbie Laws of Bromsgrove.

He served in the British Army for a few more years, leaving with the rank of lance corporal.

In May 2025, he sold his medals (Military Cross, Operational Service Medal for Afghanistan, and NATO Medal with ISAF clasp) and associated military memorabilia for £33,800; this was a record price achieved for an modern MC medal group.
