= Steamchicken =

English band

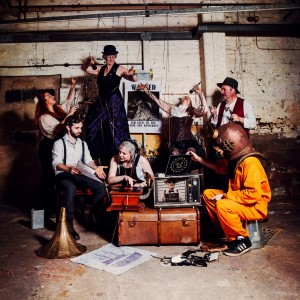

Background information
- Origin: Warwickshire, England, UK
- Genres: cèilidh-swing and jazz roots
- Years active: 1993–present
- Label: Chicken Records
- Past members: Katy Oliver – trumpet (until 2018); Ted Crum (died 2020)
- Website: Steamchicken

Steamchicken are a cèilidh-swing and jazz roots band, based in Warwickshire, England, and formed in 1993 by Bill Pound, Andrew Sharpe and Ted Crum. They have been described as "a band with attitude" and as musically mixing together "folk and Cabaret era swing jazz with panache and style". Their 2017 CD release Look Both Ways, in which they use a full brass section and a driving rhythm section, has been acknowledged as demonstrating their "knowledge of both folk and jazz, polishing traditional gems into sparkling arrangements, and adding successful original compositions to create an eminently hummable album".

== Band members ==
Amy Kakoura
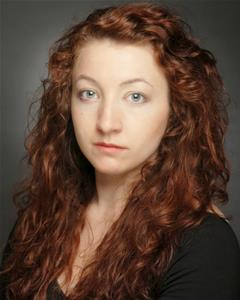

Background information
- Instrument: vocal
- Website: Amy Kakoura

- Amy Kakoura – vocals
- Andrew Sharpe – piano
- Becky Eden-Green – alto saxophone, clarinet, bass
- Joe Crum – percussion
- Tim Yates – bass
- Mandy Sutton – tenor saxophone
- Matt Crum – soprano saxophone, melodeon, synthesiser

Amy Kakoura also performs as a solo artist and as a duo with Andrew Sharpe. They have also written a musical together. Songs From a Ledge, in which Amy Kakoura played and sang one of the roles and Andrew Sharpe and Becky Eden-Green provided musical accompaniment, was performed in a production directed by Lana McIver at the Old Joint Stock Theatre, Birmingham in 2014.

Founding band member Ted Crum, who performed on harmonica, bass and melodeon, died in April 2020.

== Discography ==
=== Steamchicken ===
Albums

- Look Both Ways (10 February 2017), Chicken Records, STEAM16/3
- 20 Years (27 July 2013)
- Calling All Chickens (2009)
- Wingin' (2006), SCCD01
- Never Mind the Dots (1999)

Singles

- "Gypsy" (9 December 2016)
- "When I Get Low I Get High" (5 November 2016)
- "Violet Lane" (13 July 2018)

=== Amy Kakoura ===
Albums

- As guest vocalist on Richard Durrant's album A Quiet Word from the 13th Century (November 2015), The Burning Deck (TheBurningDeck001)
- As guest vocalist on Richard Durrant's album Christmas Guitars (21 October 2013), Longman Records Ltd (LONGMAN062CD)

EPs

- Half an Inch of Snow (December 2016)
