= Dule tree =

Tree used as a gallows or gibbet in Scotland

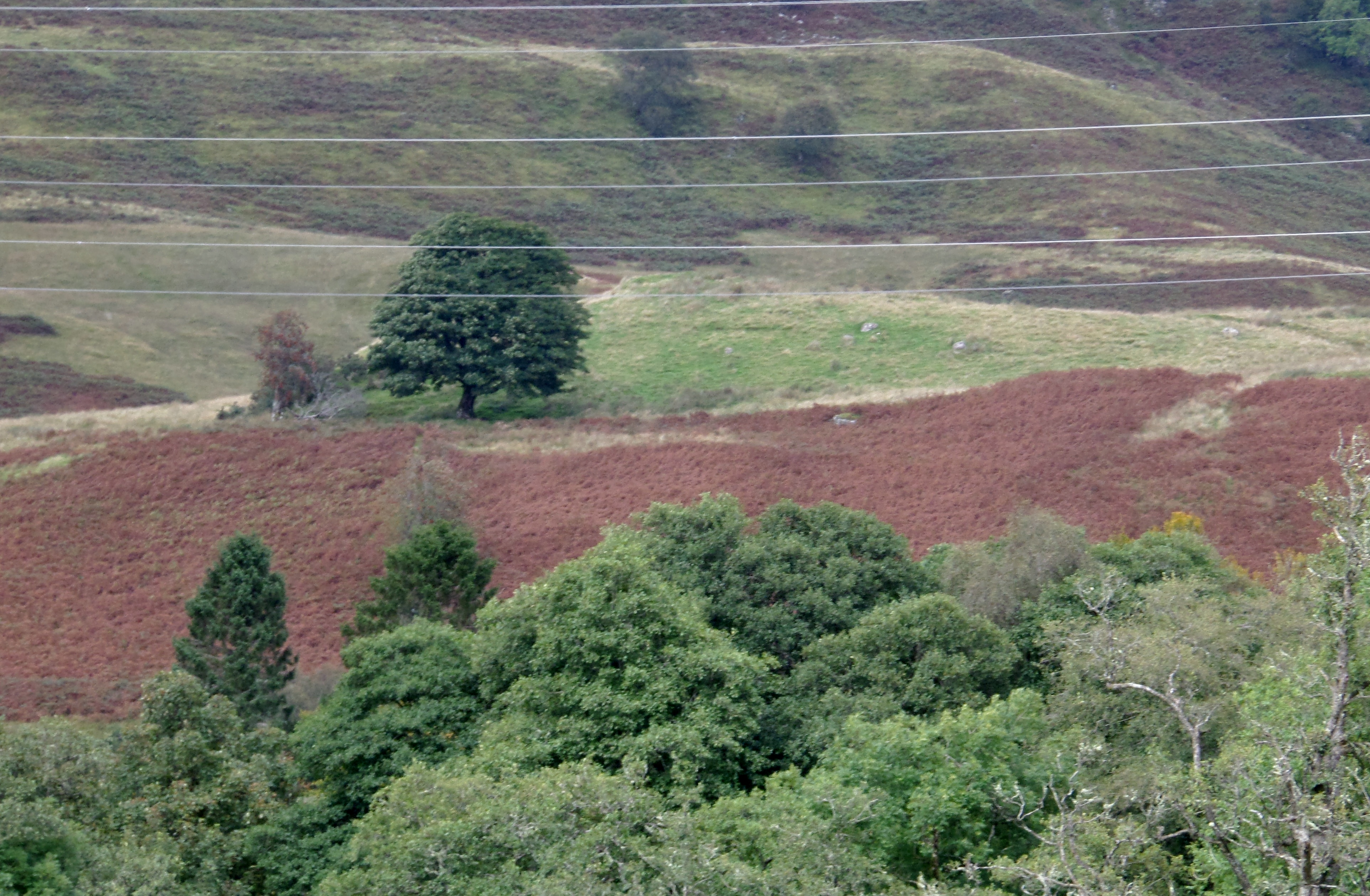
Tom Nan Croiche (Hill of the Gallows) at Dalmally in Scotland

Dule trees, or dool trees, in Scotland were used as gallows for public hangings. They were also used as gibbets for the display of the corpse for a considerable period after such hangings. These "trees of lamentation or grief" were usually growing in prominent positions or at busy thoroughfares, particularly at crossroads, so that justice could be seen to have been done and as a salutary warning to others. Place names such as Gallows-Hill, Gallows-See, Gallows-Fey and Hill of the Gallows (Tom Nan Croiche) record the site of such places of execution.

== Origins of the name ==
In Scots, the word is often rendered dule, duill, etc., which descends from Middle English (common renderings included dule, duyl, doole, dole, and dool) in reference to sorrow, grief, and other forms of distress. The word is derived from Old French dol (also sometimes rendered doel) — in turn derived from Vulgar Latin dolus ("pain, grief"); compare also modern French deuil ("mourning"). A doomsdale (variously written as dimmisdale or dymisdale — originally an Old English expression, “domes dæl,” meaning “valley of judgement”) was the route to the dule tree along which the condemned was led. Examples are recorded from Inverness and the Scottish Borders.

In Scottish Gaelic, a gallows is known as a croich: a term ultimately derived from Latin crux ("cross").

== History ==
A predecessor of such trees was the Roman furca, a device for punishing or hanging slaves. The binomial expression 'furca and fossa' refers to high justice, which included the capital penalty. The furca refers to the gallows for hanging men; the fossa ('pit') was a ditch for the drowning of women. Together, they were 'pit and gallows'.

With the introduction to Scotland of the feudal system in the 12th century, pre-feudal Celtic tenures were transformed into holding from the Crown, and a number of these were held directly or in chief of the Crown and were held in liberam baroniam (in free barony), with high justice (i.e., with pit and gallows). In Scotland, trees were often used as gallows. These dule trees were also known as the 'Grief Tree', the 'Gallows Tree', the 'Justice Tree' and the 'Tree'. It is said that King Malcolm Canmore legislated in 1057 that every barony was to have a tree for hanging convicted men and a pit of water for the execution of convicted women.

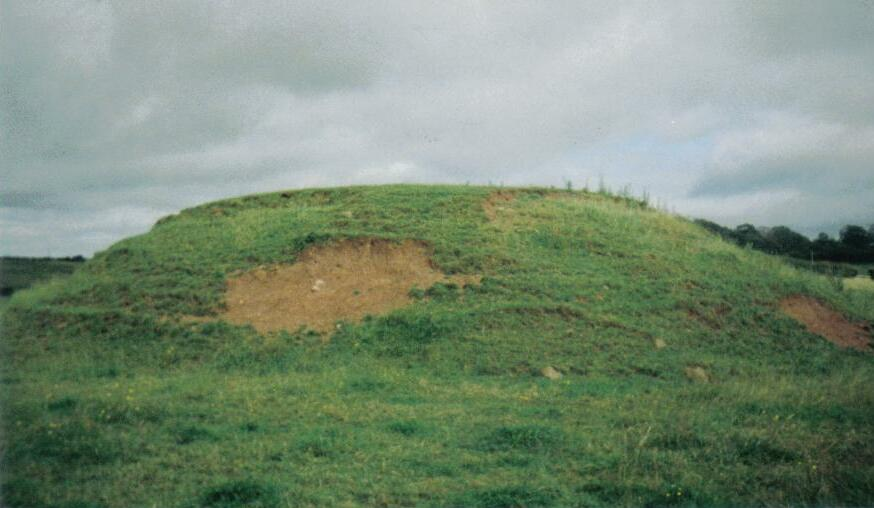
The Moot Hill, or Law Mount, above the River Annick near Castleton Farm, Stewarton, Ayrshire

These baronies belonged to the same order as earls, and these earls and barons together formed the order of the three estaits of the Scots Parliament known as the baronage of Scotland. The barons sat in the Scots Parliament until 1587, when they were relieved from attendance, which was burdensome and costly. The right of pit and gallows was removed in 1747 by the Heritable Jurisdictions (Scotland) Act 1746, lesser powers continued to the twentieth century.

Dule trees were also used by Highland chieftains, who would hang their enemies or any deserter, murderer, etc. from them. Highland clan chiefs also therefore had the power of 'life or death' over their clansmen in times gone by. The high ground on which these trees grew often became known as "gallows hills".

It is not clear whether the moot hills (justice hills) were also the site of the gallows. Some of the place names suggest that they could have been, and many were certainly in a prominent position for the display of a corpse to warn others of the consequences of wrongdoing.

'Come follow, follow, follow, follow, follow, follow me.
Whither shall I follow follow follow,
Whither shall I follow follow thee.
To the Gallows
To the Gallows
To the Gallows, Gallows Tree.'

Medieval song (sung in the round)

=== The hill of lamentation ===
Paterson is taken by the idea that dule-trees were places where a clan met to bewail any misfortune that befell the community. He cites an example where the friends and adherents of David, first Earl of Cassilis, met at the Cassilis dule-tree to lament, for several days, his loss at the disastrous Battle of Flodden in 1513. Lawson also gives these details and states that the retainers used to assemble under the tree to make lamentation upon the death of their chief, implying it was an old custom and not a 'one off.'

==== The dule trees of Johnnie Armstrong and his men ====
James V upon becoming king decided to restore order throughout the kingdom and its borders. With an army of 12,000 men he required all earls, lords, barons, freeholders, and gentlemen to meet at Edinburgh with a month's supplies, and then to proceed to Teviotdale and Annandale. James offered safe conduct to Johnnie Armstrong, the laird of Gilnockie, for a meeting in either Scotland or in England. Johnnie Armstrong commanded powerful forces and from the Scots border to Newcastle of England most estates were obliged to pay tribute to him.

When Johnnie came into the King's presence, there was no trial, just a hanging of Johnnie and his men in the trees of Caerlanrig churchyard. The trees are said to have withered and died 'for shame' and that the same has happened to any trees planted since. Johnnie is said to have shouted to James, "I have asked grace at a graceless face." This peremptory execution weakened rather than strengthened James's authority in the borders.

== Surviving examples ==
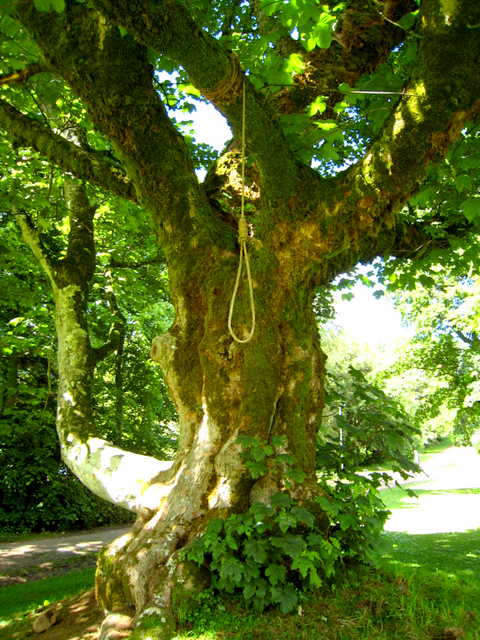
The Dule Tree, at Leith Hall

These trees were often close to the residence of the lord or clan chief and one of the best known dule trees stands within the grounds of Leith Hall, near Huntly, Aberdeenshire. This tree, a sycamore (Acer pseudoplatanus), was used as a natural gibbet and a means for publicly carrying out feudal justice. The strong timber, not prone to snapping, made this a favoured species for this purpose. Leith Hall dates from about 1650 and the tree was possibly planted shortly after this. A rather gaunt and heavily branched tree, the trunk measures 116 cm in diameter.

At Cessnock Castle near Galston, East Ayrshire is a dule tree, a gnarled specimen of Castanea sativa - sweet chestnut.

An old beech tree is still known as a 'gallows tree' and grows in an exposed position near Monikie in Angus.

The dule tree at Cassillis Castle in South Ayrshire was blown down in a great storm during the winter of 1939-40 and when the rings on its trunk were counted, it was found to be about 200 years old. A new dule tree, grown from a cutting taken from the old one, a plane tree or sycamore maple, now stands on the original site. John or Johnny Faa, King of the Gypsies is said to have been hanged from the Cassillis Dule Tree, together with some of his supporters. On the Water of Minnoch is a deep pool known as the 'murder hole' in which a family from Rowantree dumped their victims; they were caught, confessed and were the last to be hanged on the dule tree.

The author Joseph Train records however that at the last shire-mote ever held in Carrick by the Earl of Cassillis, the MacKillups of Craingenreach were hanged on the dule tree of Cassillis circa 1746, having murdered a neighbour and thrown his remains into "the common murder hole of the Bailiery at Craigenreach".

Kilkerran House in South Ayrshire has a dule tree in its grounds.

The ancient sycamore that stands in the shadow of Blairquhan Castle, near Straiton, South Ayrshire is thought to be a dule tree, planted early in the 16th century during the reign of King James V of Scotland. The moss-covered trunk has a girth of 5.6 metres (18 feet 4 inches), and is completely hollow, with only a very thin outer shell of sound wood supporting the tree. The once spreading crown was heavily pruned in 1997 in an effort to preserve the fragile shell and prevent the much-weakened trunk from total collapse. Vigorous new growth is now establishing a new, smaller crown.

Near the village of Logierait in Perthshire is the hollow ash tree of the Boat of Logierait, which, 63 feet in height and 40 in girth at 3 feet from the ground, is said to have been ` the dool tree of the district, on which caitiffs and robbers were formerly executed, and their bodies left hanging till they dropped and lay around unburied. '

An example may still exist at Bargany in South Ayrshire where a European ash (Fraxinus excelsior), served the role of the baronial dule tree.

An example is said to survive at Douglas Castle, located around 1 km north-east of the village of Douglas, South Lanarkshire aka Castle Dangerous of Sir Walter Scott's novel of that name.

Smith records in 1895 that the stump of the dule tree at Newark Castle was carefully preserved.

Hangman's Elm, or simply the "hanging tree", is an English elm located in New York City, over 300 years old. Traitors are said to have been hanged at this location during the American Revolutionary War. Later, the Marquis de Lafayette is said to have witnessed the 'festive' hanging of 20 highwaymen here in 1824.

== Previous sites of old dule trees ==
In 1685 two Covenanters, Thomas Gordon and Alexander McCubbin, were hanged on an oak tree near Kirkpatrick Irongray in Dumfries and Galloway. The tree is said to have never produced another leaf after the execution.

In the 1830s, a gallows-tree still stood in the Edinburgh grass-market, surrounded by the actual scaffold with a ladder leaning against the structure for the ascent.

Auchendrane castle also (Auchindraine) in South Ayrshire sits on the banks of the River Doon and had a famous dule tree, long ago blown down in furious gale. This tree was an ash and stood in front of the castle; described as being one of the finest trees in the district. The last Mure of Auchendrane was arrested for non-payment of a small debt and the bailiff, out of compassion, offered to settle the debt in exchange for the dule tree. The Laird of Auchendrane replied that he would rather rot to death in the worst dungeon than sell the dule tree of Auchendrane. Another version of its fate is that it was cut down and sold to a cabinet maker in Maybole who made a chest of drawers out of it. It is marked on Andrew Armstrongs 1775 map of Ayrshire.

Hunterston castle near West Kilbride had a dule known as the 'hanging tree' or 'resting tree'. It was an ash and stood near to the gardens on the line of the old road between Fairlie and West Kilbride. An oak tree was planted to replace it. A legend of a beautiful lady fairy is also associated with this dule tree.

Newark Castle near the River Doon in South Ayrshire (old Carrick) had a dule-tree near its grand stair. It was an ash measuring about 15 feet circumference and it had five principal branches.

Evelix Farmhouse regality Court-House and gallows tree in the parish of Dornoch. According to the farmer at Evelix the gallows tree stood until recently in a niche in a wall nearby.

The Victoria Bridge, Crathie and Braemar in Aberdeenshire has an old Scots pine tree that stands on the south side of the road leading to Mar Lodge, and to the west of the bridge. This was traditionally the gallows tree for the barony.

Tushielaw Tower gallows tree, parish of Ettrick in the Scottish borders. The tree was an ash tree in the ruins of Tushielaw Tower on which Adam Scott, the 'King of the Thieves', was hanged on the orders of James V.

Lynstock near Abernethy, Perth and Kinross. An ancient fir still stood in the 20th century when it was thought to be over 300 years old. At a height of 12 feet from the ground it had a strong projecting bough, and it is said that it was from it that the noose cord or wuddie was hung. There were marks of graves at the foot of the tree, tradition says of two brothers, as stated by the reverend, Grant, and therefore the tree is sometimes called the "tree of the brothers."

The Gallowshill across the main road from Rossdhu House, home of the chiefs of the Clan Colquhoun, marks the site of their "dule-tree."

Tom Nan Croiche (Hill of the Gallows) lies above the village of Dalmally in Glenorchy, Argyll and Bute. A tree still marks the spot and it is recorded that the condemned men sometimes had to carry their own gibbet or gallows up the hill and the hole where the post was placed still exists. A tree on the site was sometimes used. Unusually a hangman's house once stood near the spot.

== Local history ==
Place names are usually a fairly reliable source of information about past events and activities, as with names such as Gallowayford at Kennox House in North Ayrshire near Chapeltoun. It is known that a gallows was situated here; however, it cannot be proved that a dule tree was involved. Law Mount is a common name for small earth mounds, frequently in prominent positions, such as the example near Lambroughton, Stewarton in North Ayrshire. Public hangings took place on these 'laws' or 'moot hills', some of which are or were wooded. Gallows-Knowe in Kilmarnock, East Ayrshire was the site of the gallows for the baronial court of the Boyds of Dean Castle. Gallow Law is a hill overlooking Newmilns in East Ayrshire.

== Dule trees in literature ==
Sir Walter Scott's Waverley novel Guy Mannering features a "Justice Tree" at the Castle of Ellangowan. The corpses of murderers were gibbeted and eventually buried at crossroads so that their spirits would be "bound" there. The living took pains to prevent the dead from wandering the land as lost souls – or even as animated corpses, for the belief in revenants was widespread in mediæval Europe.

Weir of Hermiston, an unfinished novel by Robert Louis Stevenson, makes reference to a dule-tree.

"The Stalls of Barchester Cathedral", a ghost story by M.R. James, tells what became of the wood of a dule tree in the fictional town of Barchester, the tree having been known as the 'Hanging Oak'.

A Scottish ballad, "The Wronged Mason," tells of one Lambert Lamkin who is hanged on the dule-tree of Balwearie Castle in Fife.

"The Dule Tree" was published in 2004 by Finavon Print in association with the Elphinstone Institute, to mark the end of Sheena Blackhall's residency as Creative Writer in Scots at the University of Aberdeen.

The Black Douglas (1899) by S. R. Crockett (1859–1914) has the line "and let that wight remember that the Douglas does not keep a dule tree up there by the Gallows Slock for nothing."

Girvan was the site of the "Hairy Tree." According to legend, the Hairy Tree was planted by Sawney Bean's eldest daughter in the town's Dalrymple Street. The daughter was implicated with the rest of the family in their incestuous and cannibalistic activities and was hanged by locals from the bough of the tree she herself planted. According to local legend, one can hear the sound of a swinging corpse while standing beneath its boughs.

The 1844 edition of the Ayrshire Wreath contains the story of the Dule Tree of Cassillis and its last victims.

== See also ==
- Drowning pit
- Hanging tree (United States)
- Jail tree
- Dooley
- Revenant (folklore)
- Gibbet
- The Hangman (poem)
- Moot hill
