= R Guy Ramsay =

Scottish clergyman (1895-1976)

Rev R Guy Ramsay
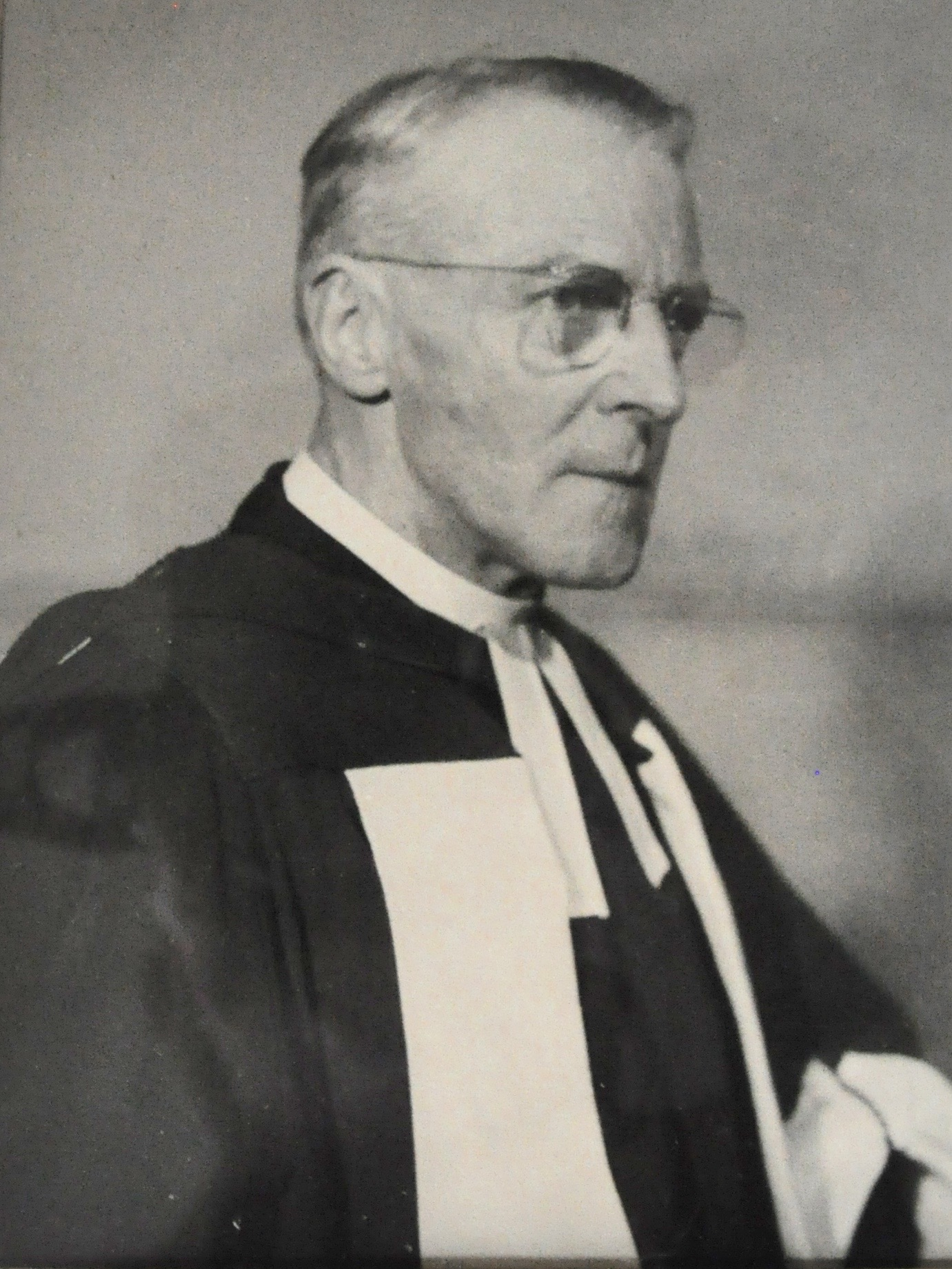
- Born: August 14, 1895; Maybole, Ayrshire, Scotland
- Died: July 12, 1976 (aged 80); Glasgow, Scotland
- Occupations: Baptist Minister, Author
- Known for: Hillhead Baptist Church
- Spouse: Elizabeth Gertrude Campbell (1885-1980)
- Children: Florence (born and died, 1923); Thomas (born 1923); Eric (born 1927); Robert (born 1935)
- Parent(s): Thomas Ramsay; Jane Easedale Guy

Reverend Robert Guy Ramsay (1895–1976) was a twentieth-century Scottish Baptist minister and author, most closely associated with Hillhead Baptist Church, Glasgow, Scotland. Rev Guy Ramsay was President of the Baptist Union of Scotland during the late 1940s.

== Early life ==
Robert Guy Ramsay was born in Maybole, Ayrshire, in south-west Scotland in 1895. His father was the Baptist lay preacher and industrialist Thomas Ramsay, associated with establishing Maybole Baptist Church, where he served as pastor from 1901 to 1919. The family had historical roots in Ayrshire. Robert Guy Ramsay's uncle, James Ramsay, was provost of Maybole during the 1910s.

He attended High School of Glasgow, Glasgow University, and following war service, the Baptist Theological College of Scotland (1918–22), all located in Glasgow, Scotland.

== Career ==
Great War service (1915-1917)

During the Great War, Robert Guy Ramsay was commissioned into the Cameronians (Scottish Rifles), in 1915, through the Inns of Court regiment in London, and served as Lieutenant in France. He was invalided from the regiment on medical grounds in 1917.

Baptist minister (1918-1970)

Following his Great War service, Rev R Guy Ramsay held seven consecutive Baptist pastorates spanning half-a-century. While studying at the Baptist Theological College of Scotland (1918-1922) Rev Guy Ramsay was elected a student pastor to Kirkintilloch Baptist Church, with a congregation numbering 200. After completing his theological college accreditations, in 1922, Rev Guy Ramsay made a preaching tour of the United States and Canada, after which he accepted a full pastorate to Dunfermline West Baptist Church in the east of Scotland. In the 1930s, after two more ministries in England, he was appointed by Horfield Baptist Church, then one of the largest churches in the United Kingdom, with a congregation exceeding a thousand.

During the Second World War, Rev Guy Ramsay provided ministry during the Blitz aerial bombing of London, including Church services and support to London-based families in north London. This included, for example, services for young children at Ebeneezer Baptist Church in the summer of 1942. He later wrote of surviving the Blitz, "When the German bombers were roaring over London, one had occasionally a strange kind of feeling that they were after you personally. But it was a fleeting ephemeral mood, dispelled each morning by the rising sun."

Rev Guy Ramsay returned to Scotland in 1943, accepting the pastorate of Hillhead Baptist Church in 1943, his seventh and final ministry, where he served for nearly three decades. As one highlight of his ministry, in 1955, members of Hillhead Baptist Church facilitated contact between visiting New Zealand clergyman Lloyd Crawford and the American evangelist Billy Graham. This led to Billy Graham visiting New Zealand in the 1950s. Graham was in Glasgow for a six-week visit, stressing spiritual and euphoric aspects of evangelism. This received mixed views from Scottish Baptist ministers more focused on practical interpretations and guidance.

The complete list of Rev Guy Ramsay's ministries were:

- 1918-1922: Kirkintilloch Baptist Church, Dunbartonshire, Scotland (concurrent with studies at Baptist Theological College of Scotland)
- 1922-1924: West Baptist Church, Dunfermline, Fife, Scotland
- 1924-1930: Accrington Baptist Church, Lancashire, England
- 1930-1936: Letchworth Baptist Church, Hertfordshire, England
- 1936-1939: Horfield Baptist Church, Bristol, England
- 1939-1943: Ferme Park Baptist Church, Hornsey, London
- 1943–1970, his retirement: Hillhead Baptist Church, Glasgow, Scotland

President of the Baptist Union of Scotland (1948-1949)

Rev Guy Ramsay was elected president in 1948, thirty years into his ministry. His commencement address, delivered in Aberdeen, stressed the importance of reducing Church divisions. He was the fourth minister from Hillhead Baptist Church to be president of the Baptist Union of Scotland. Rev Guy Ramsay's father, Thomas Ramsay, of Maybole Baptist Church, was a past President of the Baptist Union of Scotland in the 1920s. Shortly after assuming the presidency, Rev Guy Ramsay marked the golden jubilee (fifty year anniversary) of Dundee Baptist Church in 1948.

Rev Guy Ramsay retained active interest in the Scottish Baptist community as a result of the presidency. In 1950, for example, he spoke at the Baptist Missionary Society, in Stirling; in 1952 he inducted new Baptist ministers in Aberdeen; in 1952, he opened the Christian Youth Assembly in Glasgow; in 1954 he spoke at Dundee Christian Conference and provided Christian service to the Glasgow Boys' Brigade.

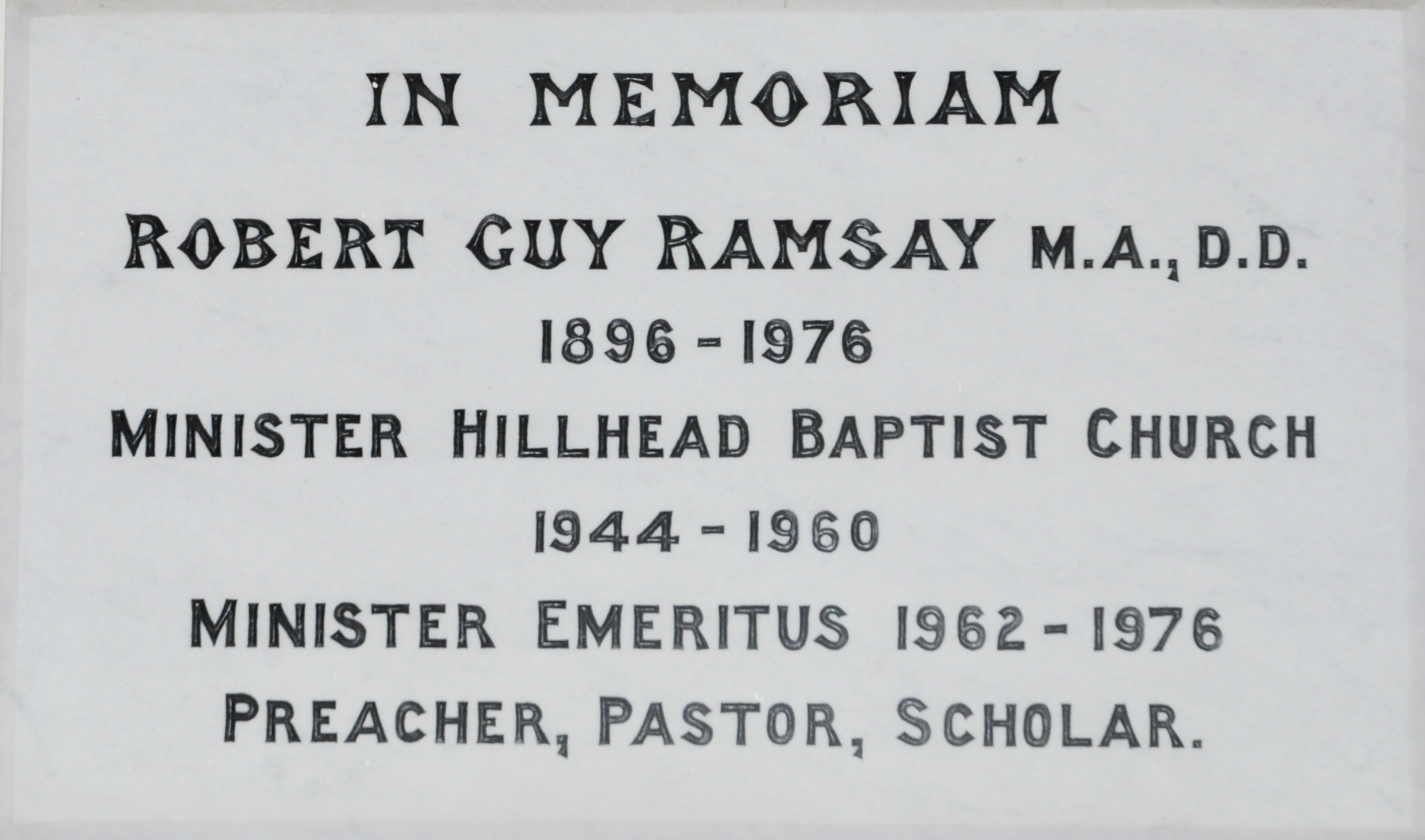
Plaque commemorating Rev R Guy Ramsay at Hillhead Baptist Church, Glasgow, Scotland

During the 1950s, he continued a theme from his presidency, warnIng against the decline in church numbers and rise of secularism within Scotland and around the world. He sought greater unity among religious denominations, and stressed: "We use the same Bible. We sing the same hymns, and we hold the same fundamental doctrines of the faith. Religious competitive enterprise should be left behind."

Writing Rev Guy Ramsay published three books, all with Christian themes and connected to his preaching.

- Since the World Began: Studies in Genesis (1927).
- Christ's portrait of a Christian: A series of studies on 'The Sermon on the Mount (1947). The book is based on twelve sermons.
- The Lord's Prayer in Modern Life (1950s), Kingsgate Press

Rev Guy Ramsay also featured in two compilations on preaching methods during the 1950s:

- "My Way of Preaching" (1953).
- "The Sacramental Table. A series of addresses by representative Scots preachers" (1955). Rev Guy Ramsay, chapter 13, "Participating in the body of Christ",

He also made various written submissions in Baptist literature during the 1930s-1950s, such as The Baptist Quarterly.

== Personal life ==
Robert Guy Ramsay was born in 1895 at Lilybank House, Maybole, Ayrshire, Scotland. This house was later gifted, in 1919, as a manse to Maybole Baptist Church, in gratitude for his surviving the Great War. He married Gertrude Elizabeth Campbell, in 1921, with whom he had one daughter and three sons, two of whom attended Taunton School. The daughter died in infancy. He was survived by Gertrude, who died in 1980.

== Death ==
He died in Glasgow in 1976. Hillhead Baptist Church raised a memorial plaque within the church commemorating his life's service. It ends: "Preacher, Pastor, Scholar."
