= Thomas Ramsay (Scottish Baptist) =

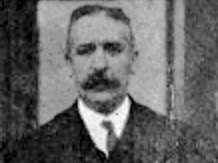
- Born: 11 April 1857; Maybole, Ayrshire, Scotland
- Died: 12 July 1934 (aged 77); Maybole, Ayrshire, Scotland
- Occupations: Baptist lay preacher, businessman
- Known for: Establishment of Maybole Baptist Church
- Spouse(s): Margaret Lamont Black (to 1890, her death); Jane Guy (1893–1934, his death)
- Children: Catherine (born 1887); Jessie (born 1890); Robert (born 1895)
- Parent(s): Thomas Ramsay (Sr); Catherine Arthur

Thomas Ramsay (1858–1934) was a Scottish lay pastor and businessman. In addition to commercial success in shoe manufacturing during the late nineteenth and early twentieth centuries, he played a formative role in establishing Maybole Baptist Church, opened 1914, and later in the Baptist Union of Scotland, of which he was president during the 1920s.

== Early life ==
Thomas Ramsay was born in Ayrshire, south-west Scotland in 1857. He was the fifth and final child of Thomas Ramsay (Sr, born 1811) and Catherine Arthur (born 1814). The family had historical roots in Ayrshire and shoe manufacturing.

He had limited schooling and, after varied work including an ironmongery apprenticeship, returned to the family business of shoe manufacturing. From the 1880s onwards he was manager of the family's shoe factory in Maybole, Ayrshire.

== Career ==
Industrial

Thomas Ramsay's industrial career had greatest success within shoe and leatherware production common in Maybole from the late nineteenth century. By 1883, in partnership with his brother, James Ramsay, "Messrs. Ramsay, Boot & Shoe Manufacturers" employed 51 workers producing approximately 500 pairs of boots per week or 25,000 pairs yearly. This was 5% of total Maybole production. Thomas Ramsay's business centered around production in the St Cuthbert's area of Maybole and distribution through Glasgow. Maybole footwear manufacturers shared a nationwide retail presence throughout the United Kingdom and some overseas outlets including Canada.

In the early twentieth century, the Ramsay interest faced rising costs and automation challenges. New production methods lowered some costs. However, wider declines in shoe manufacturing after the Great War proved too significant. During the Great Depression of the 1920s, the business fell away and the Ramsay shoe factory in Maybole was repurposed to shops.

Baptist lay preacher

Thomas Ramsay commenced lay preaching in the 1880s. He opened a Maybole prayer group which used private homes and during the 1890s the disused Maybole Methodist Church. The Baptist Union of Scotland admitted Thomas Ramsay as lay pastor in 1901 when the Maybole Baptist Church opened. He was the first pastor of Maybole Baptist church, serving from 1901 until 1919. He acted as both pastor and treasurer. At the time the Baptist Union was a relatively new Church institution, having re-formed in 1869 from an earlier (lapsed) incarnation in the 1830s.

During and after the Great War, Thomas Ramsay supported, along with members of Maybole Baptist Church, a "daughter church" in Girvan, 19 km south of Maybole. This emerged from a Girvan prayer group, established in 1907. The Girvan church was destroyed by fire in the twenty-first century.

When Thomas Ramsay resigned as Pastor, in 1919, he was replaced by D M Simpson. Despite donations from Thomas Ramsay and other elders, Maybole Baptist Church carried debt for some time, although reaching debt-free status in the 1920s. On retiring, Thomas Ramsay made a further donation of a manse, citing the Great War as motivation.

On 26th February 1919, Mr and Mrs Ramsay intimated that they had agreed to present their half-villa, Lilybank Culzean Road, to the church as a manse, as a thank-offering for the safe return of their only son, Robert Guy Ramsay, from the first World War.

In 1921, Thomas Ramsay was elected President of the Baptist Union of Scotland. Themes during his presidency included solidifying Baptist identity within the United Kingdom and internationally. As one example of international concern, Thomas Ramsay's presidency addressed persecution of Baptists in Russia and Romania, which had been exacerbated by famine. Food collections by Baptist churches in Scotland during early 1922 were despatched to Moscow and provided sufficient food for 12,000 people over one winter.

At home, the Scottish identity of the Scottish Baptist Union was stressed as distinctive from "The English Union", as the Baptist Union of Great Britain and Ireland (BUGBI) was called. This Anglo-Scots divergence continued to the 1960s, when the Scottish Baptist Union sought admittance to the Baptist World Alliance, further loosening ties with BUGBI. Divisions between Scottish churches, notably involving the prominent Church of Scotland, also influenced Scottish Baptists in the early 1920s. Thomas Ramsay's immediate predecessor as President had stressed the declining influence of the Church of Scotland and that new churches emphasized different religious positions. At the end of Thomas Ramsay's presidency, the Scottish Baptist Union renewed its protest at Church of Scotland advantages.

== Personal life ==
Thomas Ramsay was born in 1857 at Greenside, Maybole. He was married three times and lost two wives to childbirth. His first wife died in childbirth during the 1880s, unnamed in census returns. His second marriage was in 1885 to Margaret Lamont Black, with whom he had two children, Catherine in 1886 and Jessie in 1889, before her death in 1890, also in childbirth.

He was married a third time in 1893, to Jane Guy, with whom he had one son, Robert, born 1895. His third wife conducted several talks and public events, including a 1925 tribute to sermons by Charles H Spurgeon and a 1932 review of missionary work by Christina Moir Forsyth in South Africa. His son, Rev R Guy Ramsay, followed him into the Baptist ministry, and was closely connected with Hillhead Baptist Church in Glasgow, Scotland. Thomas Ramsay's elder brother, James, born 1847, was Provost of Maybole during the 1910s.

== Death ==
Thomas Ramsay died in Maybole in 1934. Maybole Baptist Church installed electricity within the church building shortly after his death, where a memorial plaque commemorates this event and his life. He was survived by Jane, who died in 1951. Their shared gravestone in Maybole bears the inscription: "Life's race well run, Life's work well done, Life's crown well won."
