= Hillhead Baptist Church =

Coordinates: 55°52′34″N 4°17′28″W

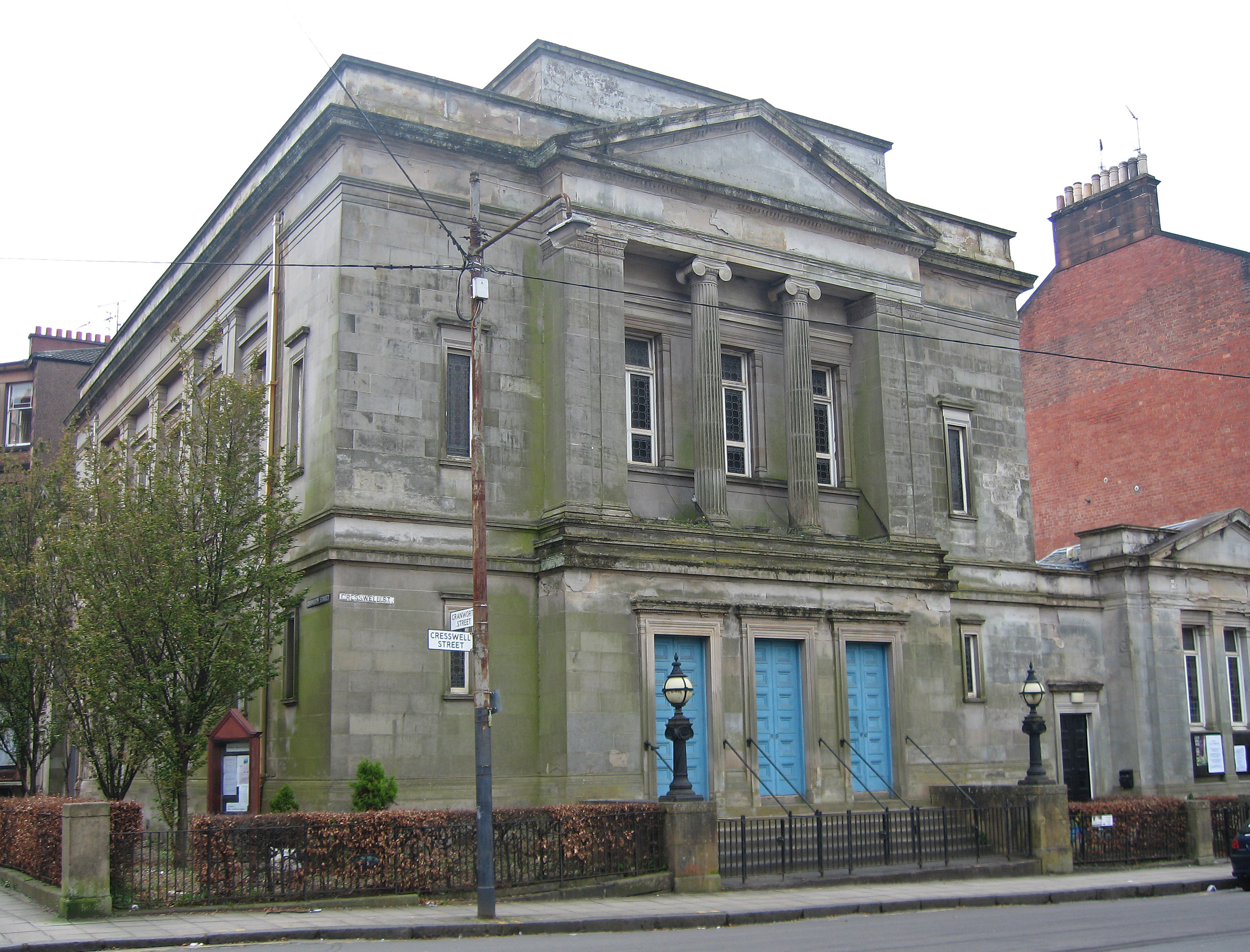
- Hillhead Baptist Church, Glasgow, Scotland
- Hillhead Baptist Church
- Location: Glasgow
- Country: Scotland
- Denomination: Baptist
- Website: https://www.hillheadbaptist.org/

History
- Founded: 19th century
- Consecrated: 1883

Architecture
- Functional status: Scheduled for redevelopment
- Architect: Thomas Lennox Watson
- Architectural type: Greek columns with casement windows and triple-doorway front access

Specifications
- Capacity: 600

Hillhead Baptist Church is a Baptist church in the west end of Glasgow, Scotland. It is affiliated with the Baptist Union of Scotland. It operated for over 130 years after 1883, one of 164 active Baptist churches in Scotland in the early twenty-first century.

External features of the church building include prominent Greek columns, casement windows, and a triple-doorway front access, with doors, by tradition, painted sky blue. Internal features include a columned gallery and two levels of seating. It was designed by Thomas Lennox Watson (1850–1920), Glasgow architect, the sixth of a dozen churches built to the Lennox Watson style during the era.

The original church location is slated for redevelopment into residential units (as of 2026), with the congregation gathering meanwhile at the nearby Grosvenor Hotel.

== Geography ==
Hillhead Baptist Church is located at 53 Creswell Street, Hillhead, Glasgow, Scotland, G12 8AE. Reflecting the church's corner location on Creswell and Cranworth streets the church's address sometimes shows as '53 Creswell Street and 30 Cranworth Street.'

The church's National Grid Reference (NGR) is NS 56742 67139, Canmore ID is 167882. Its coordinates are 256742, 667139. The church is marked on Google maps

Within Glasgow city, Hillhead Baptist Church is located 1 km from each of the Kelvingrove Art Museum and Glasgow University Chapel, 4 km from Adelaide Place Baptist Church, with which it has historical ties, and 5 km from Glasgow Cathedral. Close Baptist churches outside the city include Ayr Baptist Church and Maybole Baptist Church, both in Ayrshire.

== History ==
=== 19th century ===
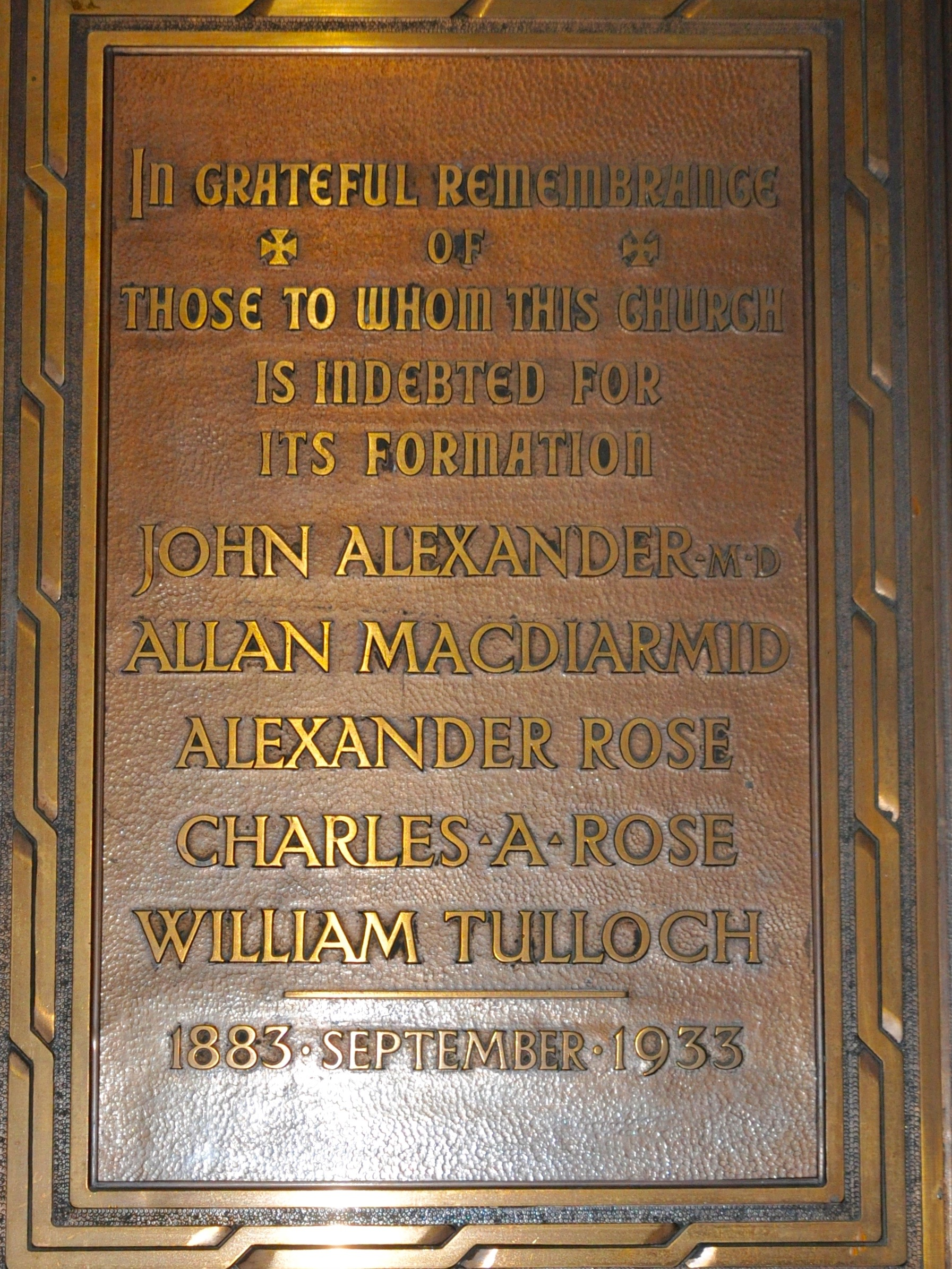
Founders plaque for Hillhead Baptist Church (1883). Five founders of the church are recognized: John Alexander, Allan MacDiarmid, Alexander Rose, Charles A Rose, and William Tulloch

It is estimated new Christian congregations in Scotland increased from a handful mid-nineteenth century to 184 assemblies in southern Scotland by 1900. Hillhead was part of this trend. Hillhead Baptist Church further benefited from the new Baptist Union for Scotland, formed in 1869, fourteen years before the church opened in 1883, relocation of Glasgow University to the Hillhead area in 1870 a Baptist Theological College established in Glasgow in the 1890s, shortly after the church opened, and flourishing missionary work in the expanding British Empire.

The church opened in 1883, stressing an open congregation and that worshippers need not be baptised, only the Minister. A plaque at the entrance to the church, erected in 1933, commemorates the founding role of five parishioners in 1883: The inscription reads:

"In grateful remembrance of those to whom this church is indebted for its formation:

- John Alexander
- Allan MacDiarmid
- Alexander Rose
- Charles A Rose
- William Tulloch"

Some of the Hillhead congregation were drawn from Presbyterian churches. Within a decade of consecration, in 1891, Hillhead Baptist Church had an established congregation exceeding 500 regular members, many of whom were prosperous merchants. Baptist churches in the western parts of Glasgow were known to attract commercially active and middle class congregations.

=== Early 20th century ===
Daughter churches, where clergy and parishioners from Hillhead helped establish new centers of Christian worship, were started in Kelvinside, Port Dundas, and Partick, the latter at a cost of £5000 when it opened in the 1910s.

=== Great War (1914–18) ===
Either side of the founding parishioners plaque are commemorations of Hillhead Baptist Church congregations who died in the 1914–18 and 1939–45 wars. Totally 32 parishioners died in the 1914–18 war, one of whom, Captain Watson T Dick received the Military Cross, and six died in the Second World War.

At the outset of the Great War, 120 male members of the congregation volunteered for military service, including most of the church's Sunday School teachers. As one example of losses early in the war, a church member who attended Fettes College, in Edinburgh, died at the Battle of Neuve Chappele in 1915. In 1916, Hillhead minister Dr John MacBeath noted the war had 'made faith difficult' and would herald significant political change. By the end of the war, Hillhead had lost fifty-five members from its congregation, the highest losses among Baptist churches in Scotland.

=== Interwar era (1918-1939) ===
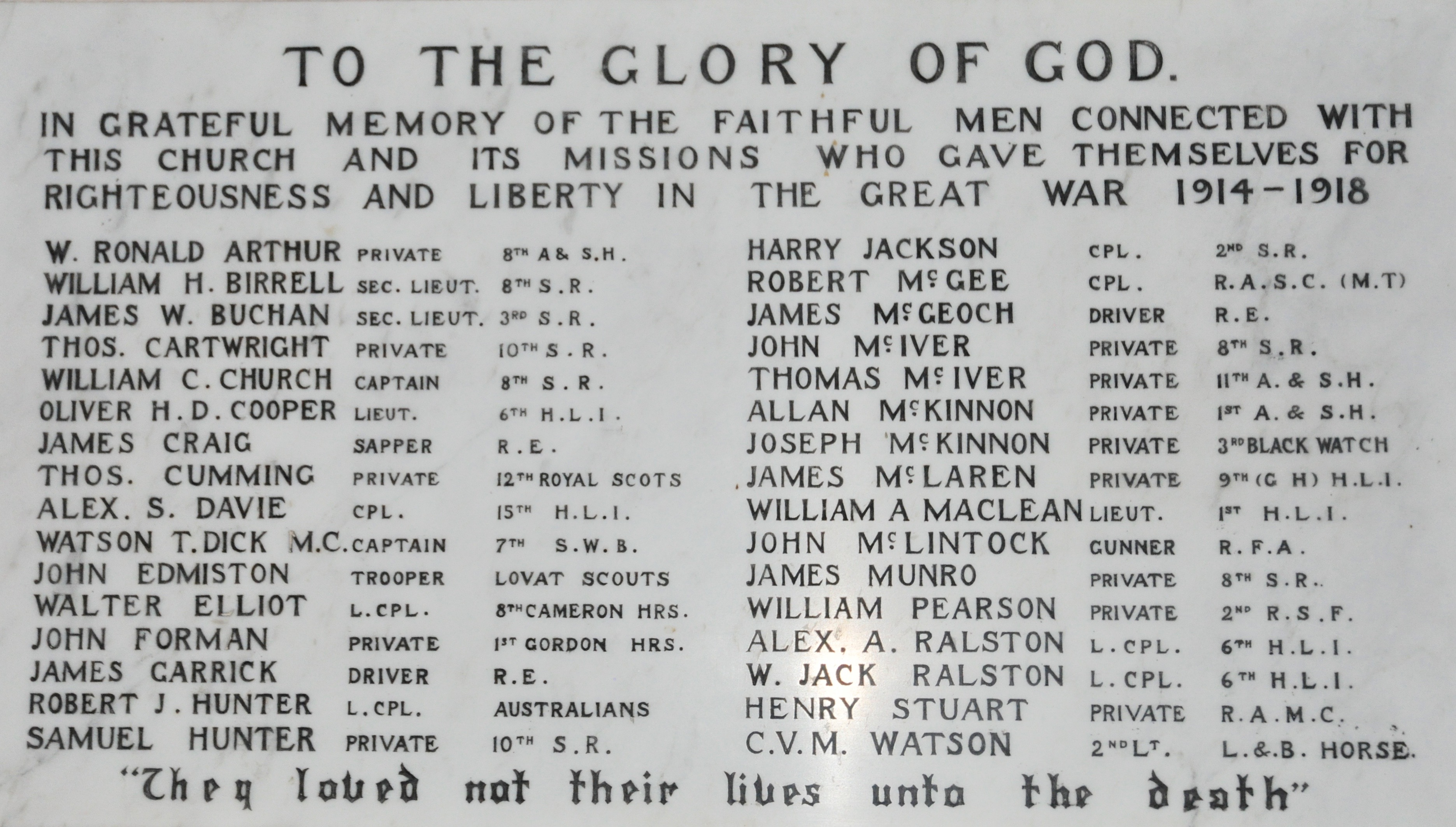
War Plaque (1 of 2). Great War dead from Hillhead Baptist Church. The list includes Captain Watson T Dick, winner of the Military Cross

The interwar years saw Hillhead Baptist Church congregations reach historical highs. Prominent church members included the Rt Hon Sir Godfrey Pattison Collins, Liberal MP for Greenock from 1910 to 1936 and Edward Rosslyn Mitchell, Labour MP for Paisley 1924–29. Other members of Hillhead Baptist Church held prominent commercial positions.

During the 1930s, Hillhead Baptist Church maintained connections with eminent and larger churches elsewhere in the United Kingdom and overseas. A third minister from Hillhead Baptist Church was elected to the Baptist Union of Scotland presidency. One of London's largest churches invited the pastor of Hillhead Baptist Church to be their pastor in 1938. The church played a prominent role in national Baptist Union meetings and community organisations such as the YWCA.

In the 1930s, as the Sino-Japanese war escalated, Hillhead Baptist Church took active interest in Baptist missionaries affected by Japanese attacks in China's coastal cities. On the outbreak of World War Two, Hillhead Baptist Church leaders raised concerns at any weakness facing Germany's Nazi threat.

=== Post World War 2 (1945 onwards) ===
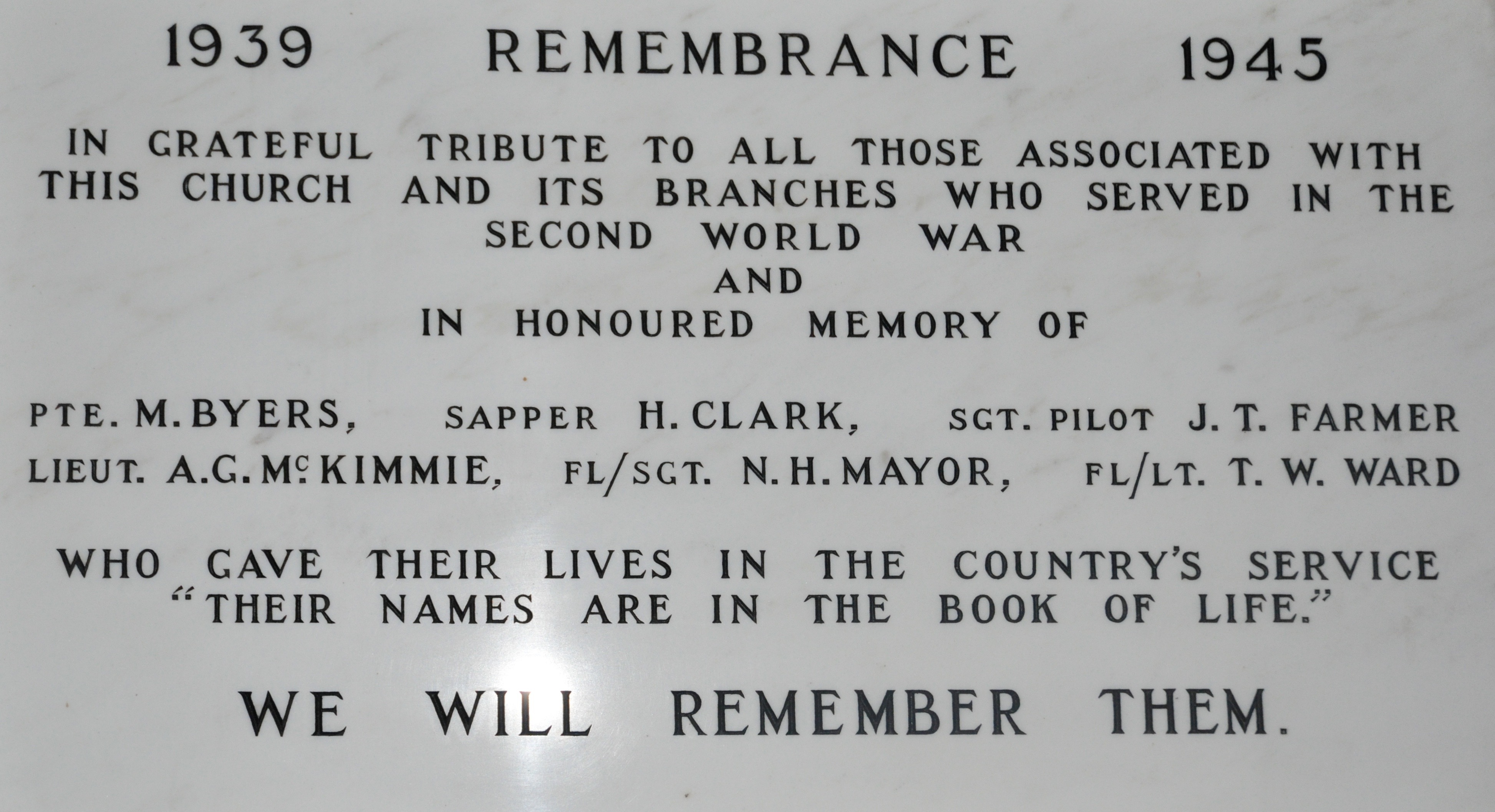
War Plaque (2 of 2). Second World War dead from Hillhead Baptist Church.

In the 1940s, a fourth minister from Hillhead Baptist Church was elected to the Baptist Union of Scotland presidency.

During the 1950s, ministers from Hillhead Baptist Church took leading roles in understanding global influences on Christianity, the Christian Youth Assembly and the Glasgow Boys' Brigade. Members of Hillhead Baptist Church facilitated contact between visiting New Zealand clergyman Lloyd Crawford and the American evangelist Billy Graham. This led to Billy Graham visiting New Zealand in the 1950s. Graham was in Glasgow for a six-week visit during 1955, stressing spiritual and euphoric aspects of evangelism. This received mixed views from Baptist ministers more focused on practical interpretations and guidance.

In the 1960s, members of Hillhead Baptist Church helped start another daughter church in Drumchapel, which was admitted to the Baptist Union in 1962. Hillhead Baptist Church contributed £5000 towards building the Drumchapel Church, plus a Minister's stipend of £200 for three years, plus supported Sunday School services. The church also helped campaigners seeking improvements to Glasgow library services.

During the 1970s, the Minister of Hillhead Baptist Church raised concerns about congregation declines across Scotland while encouraging social engagement and charity work. Although congregations fell from the 1930s peak some modest increases at Baptist churches happened within Scotland in the late 20th century.

== Church building ==
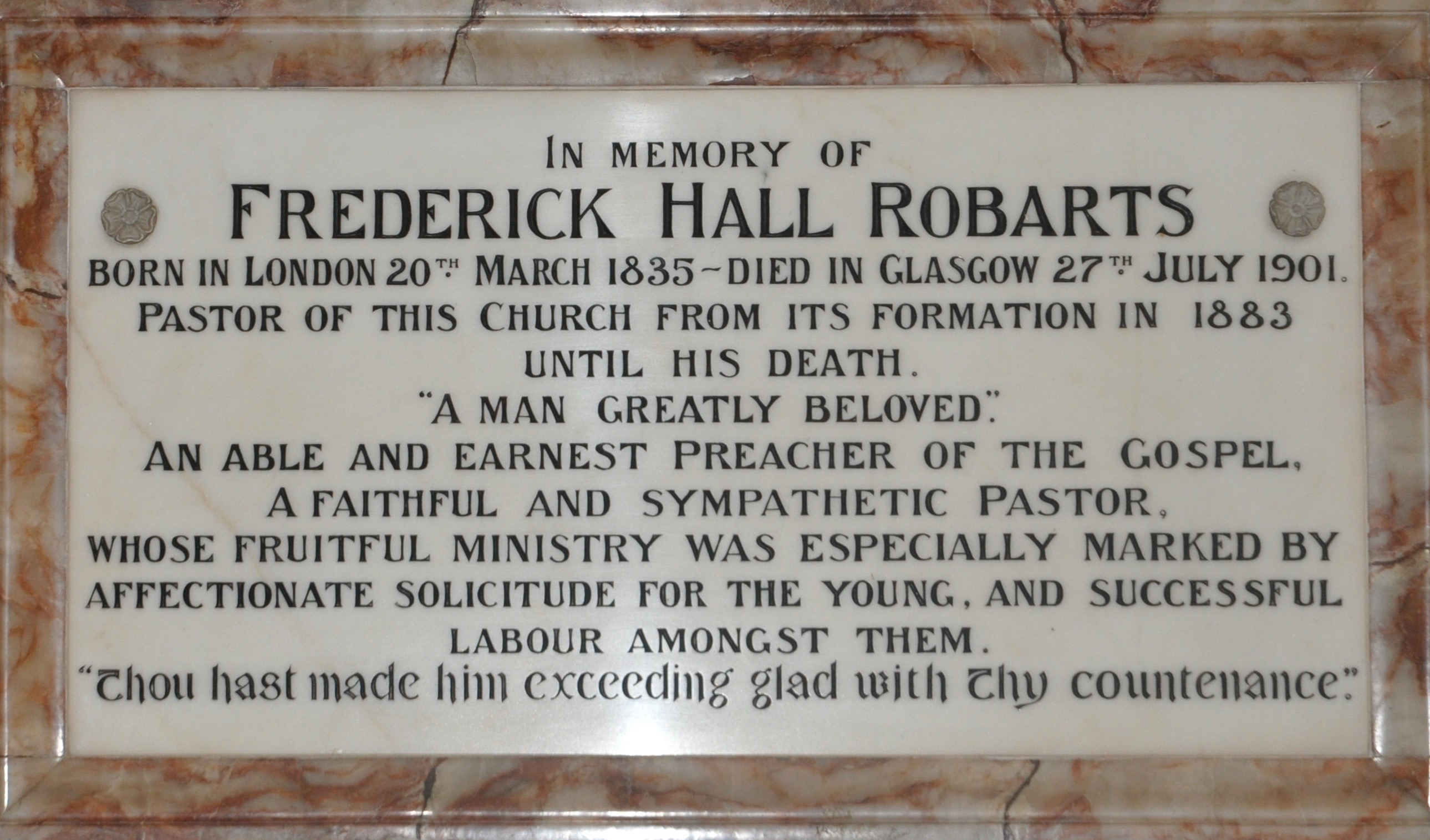
Former Pastor plaque (1 of 2). Commemorating Hillhead Baptist Church's inaugural minister, Rev Frederick Hall Robarts (1835–1901) was the church's minister from 1883, its foundation, until 1901, his death

Historic Scotland designated Hillhead Baptist Church a Category B preserved building in 1970 (building number LB32860).

The north facing church interior featured a raised gallery for the congregation illuminated by three large windows. The ceiling displayed ornate cornicing and circular patterns, which like the church's front doors, are decorated in blue.

The church interior featured three memorial stones recognising past church pastors: Frederick Hall Robarts (1835–1901), the inaugural Minister 1883–1901, John Thomas Forbes (1858–1936), Minister from 1901 to 1928, seven as Minister Emeritus, and R Guy Ramsay (1895–1976), Minister 1944–1960 and Minister Emeritus 1962–1976

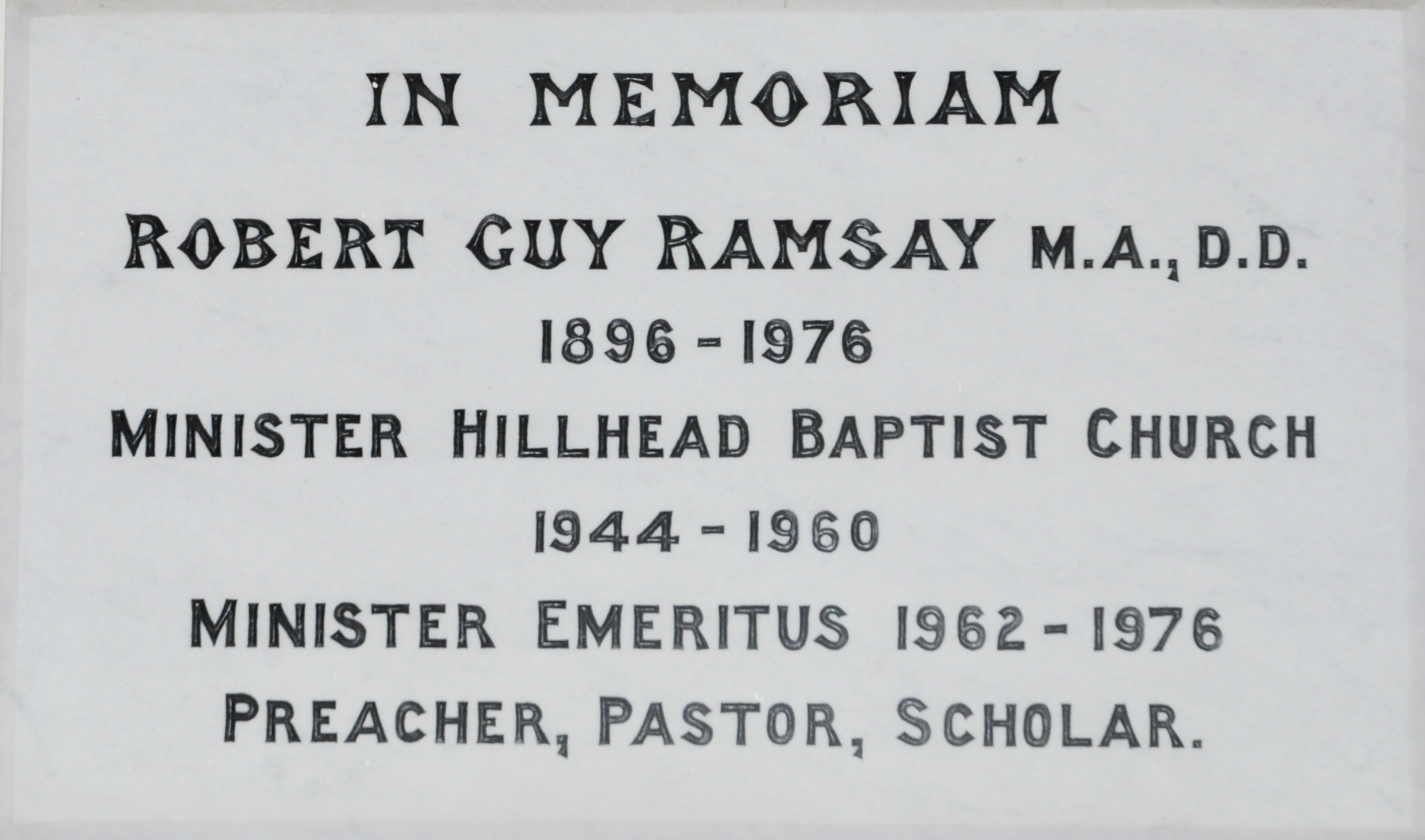
Former Pastor plaque (2 of 2). Rev R Guy Ramsay was the Hillhead pastor from 1944-1960, then Pastor Emeritus until 1976

In 2004, a long-standing member of the congregation who had amassed a multimillion-pound stock portfolio left £35,000 in her will for church repairs.

=== Status ===
Hillhead Baptist Church building declined towards tenuous status in the early twenty-first century. Church activities prior to the 2020s did include regular Christian services and community use of the church building, and the church held registered charity status with the Scottish Council for Voluntary Organisations (number SC012806, and participated in various community events.

Hillhead Baptist Church also featured in 'The Mystery Worshipper' website in 2008, which noted Hillhead's services included "...hymns ranging from traditional to the Celtic folk style of the Iona community."

In 2011, the Church secured planning permission to convert some of the Church's peripheral buildings into residential apartments. The church was also using a smaller part of the building, called the Tryst, pending repairs to the main church. In 2016, Hillhead Baptist Church was used for meetings by the Scottish Baptist history project and a venue at Glasgow's West End Festival.

In 2020, the conversion into housing was announced.In the 2020s, redevelopment of the main church building began, aiming to convert the property in to flats while retaining the facade. Plans for a new church building are included within the development. Objections led to Glasgow City Council holding a hearing. In June 2026, the demolition of the church was approved.
