= Joseph Coates =

Joseph Coates may refer to:

- Joseph Coates (cricketer) (1844–1896), English-born Australian schoolmaster and cricketer
- Joseph Coates (politician) (1878–1943), Australian politician
- Joseph E. Coates (1883–1973), British physical chemist and academic
- Joseph R. T. Coates (died 1921), American lawyer and politician from Pennsylvania
- Joseph Gordon Coates (1878–1943), prime minister of New Zealand
- Joseph F. Coates (1929–2014), American Futurist

== See also ==
- Joseph Coats (1848–1899), Scottish pathologist
