= Fever dream =

Type of dream during illness

A fever dream is a type of dream that transpires during fever or febrile illness, when the body experiences a significant elevation in body temperature beyond normal variation. These dreams are known for their bizarre or surreal experiences. While common in children, these dream occurrences can happen to people of any age. Fever dreams also have significant overlap with delirium and hallucinations.

== Early accounts ==
A second century account from Greek author and orator Aelius Aristides tells of his accounts with fevered dreams and divine visions. During one of his travels between Greece and Rome, Aristides became ill with what has been speculated to be chronic infection of the upper respiratory system and pneumonia. Aristides experienced feverish symptoms and, in his dreams, believed he was being sent messages by the god of medicine, Asclepius. These dream messages included poisoned figs, which Aristides interpreted as instructions to continue fasting, guidance on long walks and plunges in rivers and the sea. These practices greatly improved his condition which allowed him to travel to the temple of Asclepius at Pergamum.

== Early medical study ==
Fever dreams have been a fringe subject of psychological interest since at least the end of the nineteenth century. Scottish pathologist Joseph Coats wrote of his and other's experiences fever-induced delirium, noting highly realistic hallucinations during dreaming and also the belief of the hallucination's reality persisting briefly even after waking from the dream. Coats further muses on connections between fevered hallucination and clinical insanity, that an individual might appear reasonable or awake, but still harbors a delusion that is "ineradicable" from their mind.

== Nature ==
An adult's fever dreams may include dream content they have not experienced since childhood, occasionally traumatic or violent in nature. A common reoccurring theme in fever dreams is the presence of death, either of the experiencing dreamer or friend or family member. Another common experience is temperature awareness, specifically high temperatures, leading some researchers to consider a link between physical states or experiences and subconscious experiences. Additionally, research has indicated that subjects experiencing fever or febrile illness are significantly more likely to report negative dream experiences than positive.

== Psychoanalysis ==
There has been little research devoted to the psychoanalysis or interpretation of fever dreams, likely due to the limitations of recalling dreams during such specific episodes such as fever, as well as the wider practice falling out of favour in the psychological community. Despite this, author and psychiatrist Kauko Vauhkonen posits that in some cases fever dreams can provide insight to the "initial psychic awakening" of the individual and be used to unpack or relive subconscious trauma developed in early childhood.
