= List of listed buildings in Maybole, South Ayrshire =

This is a list of listed buildings in the parish of Maybole in South Ayrshire, Scotland.

== List ==
Name	Location	Date Listed	Grid Ref. (Note: Sometimes known as OSGB36, the grid reference (where provided) is based on the British national grid reference system used by the Ordnance Survey. • "Guide to National Grid". Ordnance Survey. • "Get-a-map". Ordnance Survey.)	Geo-coordinates	Notes	LB Number (Note: Historic Environment Scotland assign a unique alphanumeric identifier to each designated site in Scotland, for listed buildings this always begins with "LB", for example "LB12345".)	Image
Culzean Road Whitefaulds				55°21′14″N 4°41′25″W	Category B	37693	Upload Photo
Dailly Road Church Of Our Lady & St Cuthbert's School And Presbytery				55°20′56″N 4°41′01″W	Category B	37694	Upload Photo
27-31 (Odd) High Street				55°21′14″N 4°40′53″W	Category B	37701	Upload Photo
55-59 (Odd) High Street				55°21′14″N 4°40′55″W	Category C(S)	37706	Upload Photo
High Street, Maybole Castle, Garden Walls And Gatepiers				55°21′17″N 4°40′52″W	Category A	37709	Upload another image See more images
8, 10 Kirkland Street				55°21′23″N 4°40′38″W	Category C(S)	37715	Upload Photo
Obelisk, Kildoon				55°19′51″N 4°40′59″W	Category B	14277	Upload Photo
Dunure Castle				55°24′18″N 4°45′43″W	Category A	14293	Upload another image
2 Greenside				55°21′14″N 4°41′04″W	Category C(S)	37695	Upload Photo
18 Greenside				55°21′15″N 4°41′09″W	Category B	37697	Upload Photo
33-35 (Odd) High Street				55°21′14″N 4°40′54″W	Category C(S)	37702	Upload Photo
43-47 (Odd) High Street				55°21′14″N 4°40′55″W	Category C(S)	37704	Upload Photo
1, 3, 5 Kirkland Street				55°21′23″N 4°40′36″W	Category C(S)	37712	Upload Photo
Dunure Harbour				55°24′25″N 4°45′29″W	Category B	19683	Upload another image
High Greenan House				55°25′52″N 4°40′14″W	Category B	18846	Upload Photo
Enoch Lodge				55°21′32″N 4°43′17″W	Category B	14289	Upload Photo
East Enoch				55°21′31″N 4°42′05″W	Category B	14291	Upload Photo
Dunure Mill At Dunure Mains				55°23′46″N 4°45′39″W	Category B	14292	Upload Photo
Monkwood				55°23′58″N 4°37′25″W	Category B	14301	Upload Photo
3 Cargill Road Fair Knowe And Gatepiers				55°21′18″N 4°41′12″W	Category C(S)	37678	Upload Photo
14 Cassillis Road				55°21′22″N 4°40′43″W	Category C(S)	37681	Upload Photo
3 High Street, Post Office				55°21′17″N 4°40′50″W	Category C(S)	37699	Upload Photo
25 High Street				55°21′15″N 4°40′53″W	Category C(S)	37700	Upload Photo
1-7 Whitehall (Odd Nos)				55°21′11″N 4°41′00″W	Category B	37721	Upload Photo
4 Whitehall				55°21′11″N 4°41′02″W	Category B	37724	Upload Photo
Lodge, Stables And Gatepiers, High Greenan House				55°25′55″N 4°40′11″W	Category B	18847	Upload Photo
Nether Auchindrane House				55°24′55″N 4°37′37″W	Category C(S)	14278	Upload Photo
Greenan Castle				55°26′19″N 4°40′13″W	Category B	14298	Upload Photo
Newark Castle				55°25′17″N 4°39′08″W	Category A	14300	Upload Photo
Kilhenzie Castle				55°20′20″N 4°40′07″W	Category B	14305	Upload Photo
Ashgrove Ashgrove House				55°21′26″N 4°41′04″W	Category B	37677	Upload Photo
16-18 (Even) Cassillis Road				55°21′21″N 4°40′44″W	Category B	37682	Upload Photo
33 Castle Street				55°21′18″N 4°40′58″W	Category C(S)	37687	Upload Photo
Collegiate Church				55°21′12″N 4°40′49″W	Category A	37688	Upload another image See more images
19 Greenside				55°21′16″N 4°41′09″W	Category B	37698	Upload Photo
37-41 (Odd) High Street				55°21′14″N 4°40′54″W	Category C(S)	37703	Upload Photo
High Street, The Tolbooth				55°21′12″N 4°40′59″W	Category B	37708	Upload another image
4 Kirkland Street				55°21′23″N 4°40′38″W	Category C(S)	37713	Upload Photo
Old Cemetery Gate And Walls				55°21′14″N 4°40′47″W	Category C(S)	37717	Upload Photo
St John's Cottage				55°21′23″N 4°40′13″W	Category A	37718	Upload Photo
Welltrees Street Welltrees The Gluepot Bar				55°20′50″N 4°41′01″W	Category C(S)	37720	Upload Photo
2 Whitehall The Royal Bank Of Scotland				55°21′12″N 4°41′01″W	Category B	37723	Upload Photo
Dunduff Farm				55°24′27″N 4°44′33″W	Category B	19684	Upload Photo
Inn And Adjoining Smithy Culroy				55°23′43″N 4°39′33″W	Category B	14302	Upload Photo
96 Ladywell Road (Formerly Weavers Vennel)				55°21′02″N 4°41′09″W	Category C(S)	37716	Upload Photo
6, 8 Whitehall				55°21′11″N 4°41′03″W	Category C(S)	37725	Upload Photo
Nether Culzean				55°22′07″N 4°39′21″W	Category B	19685	Upload Photo
Sauchrie				55°23′46″N 4°40′57″W	Category B	14290	Upload Photo
Kirkbride				55°24′23″N 4°44′45″W	Category B	14297	Upload Photo
Grange				55°23′33″N 4°39′22″W	Category B	14304	Upload Photo
Doonside Estate, Doonside Dovecot				55°25′24″N 4°38′02″W	Category B	47356	Upload Photo
10 Greenside				55°21′14″N 4°41′06″W	Category C(S)	37696	Upload Photo
67 High Street Bank Of Scotland				55°21′13″N 4°40′56″W	Category B	37707	Upload Photo
6 Kirkland Street				55°21′23″N 4°40′38″W	Category C(S)	37714	Upload Photo
2 School Vennel And 82 High Street				55°21′13″N 4°40′58″W	Category C(S)	37719	Upload Photo
Dovecote, Dunure				55°24′19″N 4°45′40″W	Category A	14294	Upload another image
31 Whitehall				55°21′08″N 4°41′06″W	Category C(S)	49585	Upload Photo
23 Cassillis Road				55°21′20″N 4°40′44″W	Category B	37679	Upload Photo
25-27 (Odd) Cassillis Road				55°21′20″N 4°40′45″W	Category B	37680	Upload Photo
24 Cassillis Road				55°21′21″N 4°40′46″W	Category C(S)	37684	Upload Photo
Cassillis Road Old Parish Church				55°21′23″N 4°40′41″W	Category B	37686	Upload Photo
Coral Hill West Parish Church				55°21′02″N 4°41′21″W	Category C(S)	37689	Upload Photo
49-53 (Odd) High Street				55°21′14″N 4°40′55″W	Category C(S)	37705	Upload Photo
88-90 (Even) High Street				55°21′13″N 4°40′59″W	Category C(S)	37711	Upload Photo
9 Whitehall				55°21′11″N 4°41′01″W	Category B	37722	Upload Photo
Dunure House By Harbour				55°24′30″N 4°45′24″W	Category B	14295	Upload Photo
Dunduff Castle				55°24′39″N 4°43′52″W	Category B	14296	Upload Photo
Otterden House				55°23′44″N 4°40′20″W	Category B	14303	Upload Photo
Brae Of Auchendrane With Service Court, Terraces, Gates And Gatepiers				55°24′13″N 4°38′10″W	Category B	47336	Upload Photo
1 High Street, Carnegie Free Public Library				55°21′17″N 4°40′49″W	Category C(S)	49582	Upload Photo
22 Cassillis Road				55°21′21″N 4°40′45″W	Category C(S)	37683	Upload Photo
26 Cassillis Road				55°21′21″N 4°40′45″W	Category C(S)	37685	Upload Photo
Coral Hill West Parish Manse				55°21′00″N 4°41′16″W	Category C(S)	37690	Upload Photo
Culzean Road Barns House				55°21′20″N 4°40′54″W	Category B	37691	Upload Photo
Culzean Road Kincraig				55°21′17″N 4°41′15″W	Category B	37692	Upload Photo
32-36 High Street				55°21′16″N 4°40′54″W	Category C(S)	37710	Upload Photo
West Enoch Farm				55°21′31″N 4°42′55″W	Category B	19861	Upload Photo

== Key ==
The scheme for classifying buildings in Scotland is:

- Category A: "buildings of national or international importance, either architectural or historic; or fine, little-altered examples of some particular period, style or building type."
- Category B: "buildings of regional or more than local importance; or major examples of some particular period, style or building type, which may have been altered."
- Category C: "buildings of local importance; lesser examples of any period, style, or building type, as originally constructed or moderately altered; and simple traditional buildings which group well with other listed buildings."

In March 2016 there were 47,288 listed buildings in Scotland. Of these, 8% were Category A, and 50% were Category B, with the remaining 42% being Category C.
