= Maybole =

Town in South Ayrshire, Scotland

Coordinates: 55.3551°N 4.68°W

- Market town, Burgh of barony and Police burgh
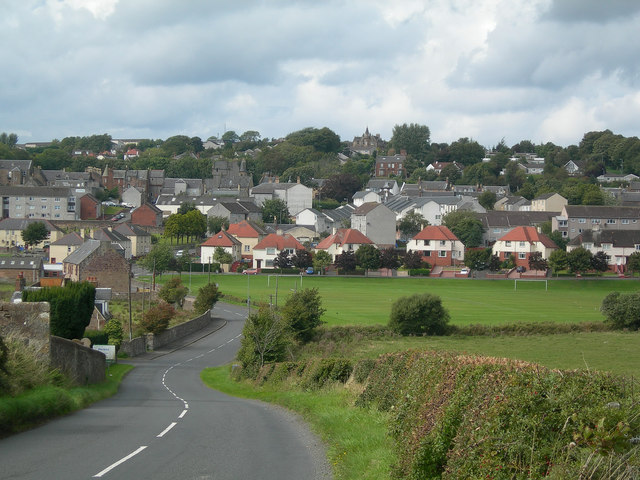
- Maybole from the Cemetery Brae

- Location within South Ayrshire
- Population: 4,333 (2022)
- OS grid reference: NS301100
  - Edinburgh: 71 mi (114 km)
  - London: 325 mi (523 km)
- Council area: South Ayrshire
- Lieutenancy area: Ayrshire and Arran
- Country: Scotland
- Sovereign state: United Kingdom
- Post town: MAYBOLE
- Postcode district: KA19
- Dialling code: 01655
- Police: Scotland
- Fire: Scottish
- Ambulance: Scottish
- UK Parliament: Ayr, Carrick and Cumnock
- Scottish Parliament: Carrick, Cumnock and Doon Valley

Maybole is a historic market town and former burgh of barony and police burgh in South Ayrshire, Scotland. It is situated 9 miles (14 km) south of Ayr and 50 miles (80 km) southwest of Glasgow by the Glasgow and South Western Railway. It had an population of 4,333 in 2022. The town is bypassed by the A77.

== History ==
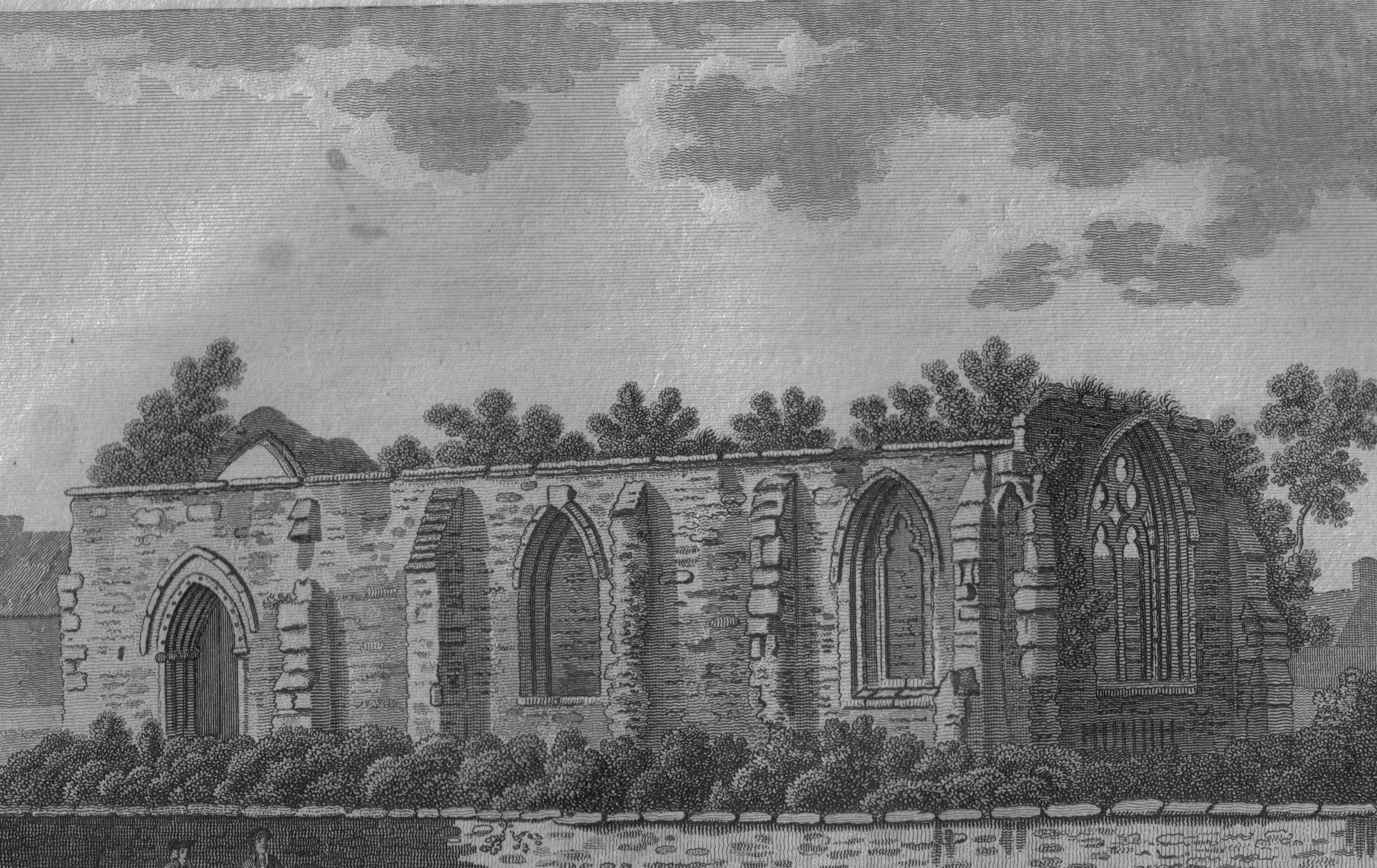
St Cuthbert's in 1789

There are no written records or mention of the town and district until the twelfth century although the area was indeed mentioned by the Romans during their occupation of South Scotland. The inhabitants were then known as the Damnii.

Maybole has Middle Ages roots, receiving a charter from Donnchadh, Earl of Carrick in 1193. In 1516 it was made a burgh of regality, although for generations it remained under the suzerainty of the Clan Kennedy, afterwards Earls of Cassillis and (later) Marquesses of Ailsa, the most powerful family in Ayrshire. The Marquess of Ailsa lived at Cassillis House, just outside Maybole until its sale in 2007. In the late seventeenth century, a census recorded Maybole was home to 28 "lords and landowners with estates in Carrick and beyond."

In former times, Maybole was the capital of the district of Carrick, Scotland, and for long its characteristic feature was the family mansions of the barons of Carrick. Maybole Castle, a former seat of the Earls of Cassillis, dates to 1560 and still remains, although aspects of the castle are viewed as "of concern". The public buildings include the town-hall, the Ashgrove and the Lumsden fresh-air fortnightly homes, and the Maybole combination poorhouse.

Maybole is a short distance from the birthplace of Robert Burns, the Scots national poet. Burns's mother was a Maybole resident, Agnes Brown.

In the nineteenth century, Maybole became a centre of boot and shoe manufacturing.

Margaret McMurray (??-1760), one of the last native speakers of a Lowland dialect of Scottish Gaelic, is recorded to have lived at Cultezron (not to be confused with nearby Culzean), a farm on the outskirts of Maybole.

== Notable landmarks ==
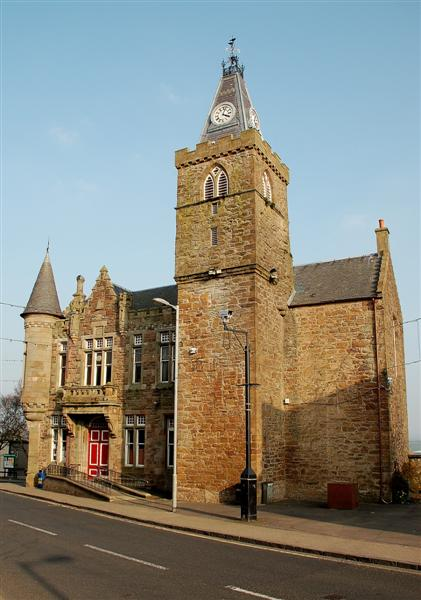
Maybole Town Hall

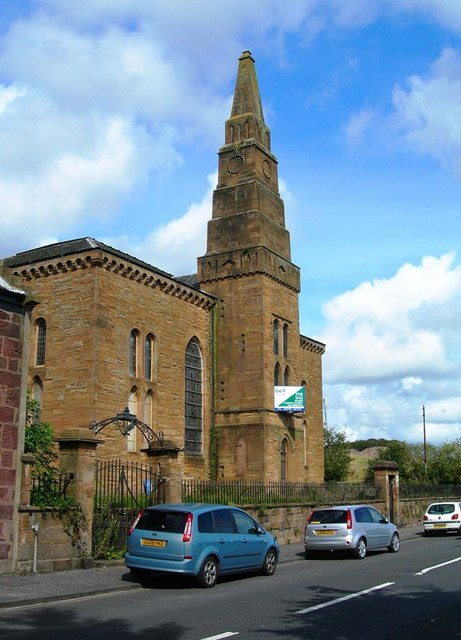
The disused Maybole Parish Church

- The ancestral seat of the Marquesses of Ailsa is Culzean Castle, now run by The National Trust for Scotland and located 4 miles (6 kilometres) west from Maybole. This dates from 1777; it stands on a basaltic cliff, beneath which are the Coves of Culzean, once the retreat of outlaws and a resort of the fairies.
- Maybole Town Hall incorporates a tower which dates back to the 16th century.
- Cassillis Castle, near Maybole, is a category A 14th century castle with 17th century and 19th century baronial extensions.
- A primary rail service is at Maybole railway station. Set up in 1860.
- 2 miles (3 kilometres) to the south-west are the ruins of Crossraguel (from Crois Riaghail meaning 'Cross of St Regulus' ) Abbey, founded about 1240.
- Our Lady and St Cuthbert Catholic Church in Maybole was opened in 1878 and it was largely funded by Catholic convert Margaret Radclyffe Livingstone Eyre (born Kennedy). A Scottish Episcopal congregation was established in 1847 to serve the English and Irish weavers in the area, and the present St. Oswald's Church was completed in 1883.
- In the early 20th century, Maybole added a Baptist church. This was admitted to the Baptist Union in 1901 and appointed its first full minister in 1919, a year after the Great War finished.
- Kirkoswald, where Robert Burns spent his seventeenth year, learning land-surveying, lies a little farther west. In the parish churchyard lie the real people who inspired two of Burns's fictitious characters Douglas Graham (Tam o' Shanter) and John Davidson.
- Farther south are the ruins of Turnberry Castle, where Robert the Bruce is said to have been born. A few miles to the north of Culzean are the ruins of Dunure Castle, an ancient stronghold of the Kennedys.

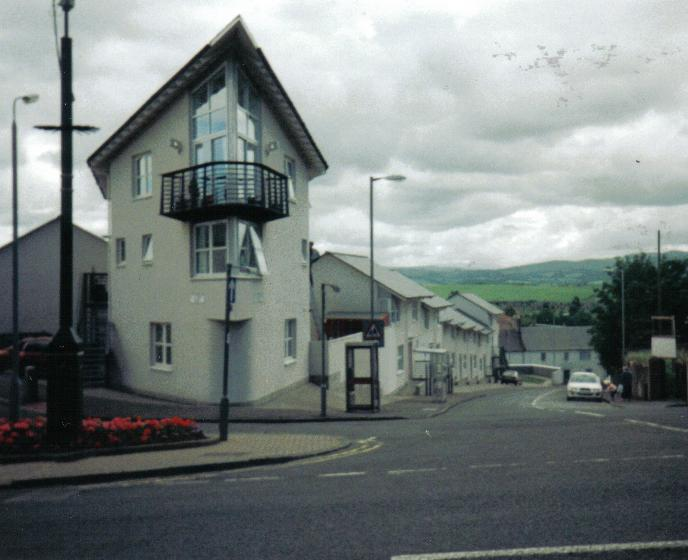
Housing on the site of the old St Cuthbert's shoe factory

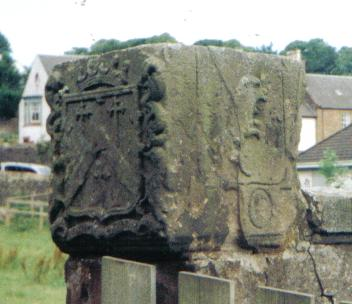
The head of the old Maybole Cross in the gardens of Maybole Castle. The cross bears the coats of arms of the Kennedy family of Cassillis and has a rare Moon dial on one face.

== Education ==
The town previously had three primary schools: Cairn Primary, Gardenrose Primary and St Cuthberts Primary.

In 2023, the three schools merged into Culzean Primary, situated on Maybole Community Campus.

The secondary school in Maybole is Carrick Academy (Previously a school of Rugby) - also now located on Maybole Community Campus.

== Sports ==
The local football club, Maybole Juniors F.C., play at Ladywell Stadium. They are members of the West of Scotland Football League.

== In popular culture ==
The lyrics of The Waterboys' "Glastonbury Song" include: "I dreamed myself from the sultry plains, To the old green square back in old Maybole ..."

== Notable residents ==
- Sir Gilbert Blane (1749–1834), 18th–century physician and Royal Navy reformer.
- Bernard Fergusson, Baron Ballantrae (1911–1980), part of the Fergusson family, and Governor-General of New Zealand, 1962–67.
- Robert MacBryde (1913–1966), a well-known painter of the 'Modern' school of art and theatre designer.
- John Loudon McAdam (1756–1836), Scottish engineer and roadbuilder of the eighteenth century.
- Norris McWhirter (1925–2004), founder of the Guinness Book of World Records, is descended from the McWhirters of Maybole.
- Sir William Montgomery-Cuninghame (1834–1897), recipient of the Victoria Cross in 1854 during the Crimean War
- Rev R Guy Ramsay (1895–1976), Scottish Baptist minister and President of the Baptist Union of Scotland, 1948–49.
- Thomas Ramsay (1857–1934), first pastor of Maybole Baptist Church, 1901–19, and President of the Baptist Union of Scotland, 1921–22.
- Rev Dr William King Tweedie (1803–1863), Scottish historian, biographer and minister of the Free Church of Scotland.

== Twin towns ==
Maybole is twinned with:

- Belœil, Wallonia, Belgium
- Crosne, Essonne, France
- Schotten, Hesse, Germany
- Arco, Trentino, Italy

== See also ==
- Minishant
