= Maybole Town Hall =

Municipal building in Maybole, Scotland

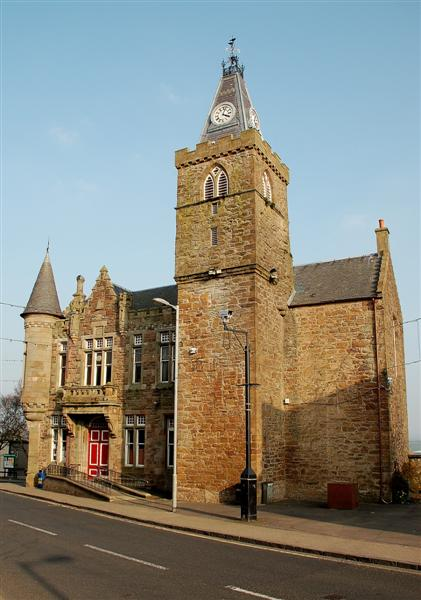
- Maybole Town Hall

- Shown in South Ayrshire
- 55.3533°N 4.6827°W
- Location: High Street, Maybole

History
- Built: 1887

Site notes
- Architect: Robert Samson Ingram
- Architectural style: Scottish medieval style

Listed Building – Category B
- Official name: Town Hall, High Street, Maybole
- Designated: 14 April 1971
- Reference no.: LB37708

Maybole Town Hall is a municipal structure in the High Street in Maybole, South Ayrshire, Scotland. The structure, which is used as a community events venue, is a Category B listed building.

== History ==
The oldest part of the complex is the tower which formed part of house known as Blairquhanes Place. The house was designed in the Scottish medieval style, built in rubble masonry and dated back to the 16th century. The tower was originally surmounted by a balustrade and a pyramid-shaped roof with a clock. Internally, there was a lock up on the ground floor and a courtroom on the first floor. In October 1674, John Kennedy, 7th Earl of Cassilis, acquired the house, demolished much of the original structure, and converted the tower for use as a tolbooth: further repairs were commissioned by Archibald Kennedy, 11th Earl of Cassilis in the late 18th century, and the tower was crenelated in 1812.

The building was substantially extended to the northeast in the Scottish baronial style to a design by Robert Samson Ingram of Kilmarnock in rubble masonry in 1887. The design of the extension involved an asymmetrical main frontage with four bays facing onto the High Street. In the second bay from the left there was a segmental headed doorway with a fanlight and hood mould flanked by brackets supporting a balustraded balcony with finials; on the first floor, there was a tripart mullioned and transomed window with a stepped gable above. The other bays were fenestrated by mullioned and transomed windows in a similar style and, at the left-hand corner, there was a bartizan with a conical roof. Internally, the principal room was an assembly hall with capacity for 150 people.

The building continued to serve as the meeting place of the burgh council for much of the 20th century but ceased to be the local seat of government when the enlarged Kyle and Carrick District Council was formed in 1975. In April 2022, contractors started a programme of refurbishment works which was costed at £1.2million and funded by the Scottish Government, the National Lottery Heritage Fund, Historic Environment Scotland, South Ayrshire Council and the North Carrick Community Benefit Company. The works, which included a new entrance on the northeast side, a new roof for the tower and masonry repairs as well as internal re-wiring, were scheduled to be completed in February 2023.

== See also ==
- List of listed buildings in Maybole, South Ayrshire
