= Adelaide Place Baptist Church =

Coordinates: 55.8646°N 4.2646°W

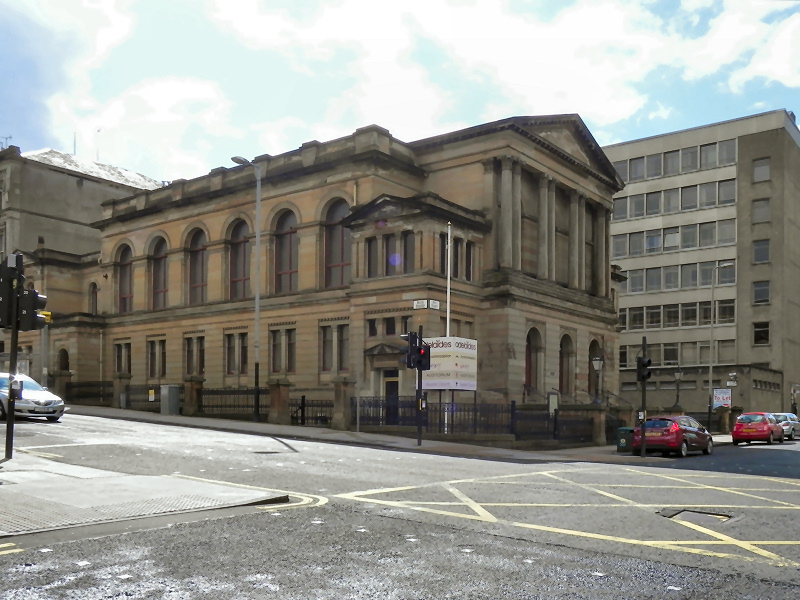
- Adelaide Place Baptist Church
- Adelaide Place Baptist Church
- Location: Glasgow
- Country: Scotland
- Denomination: Baptist
- Website: www.apbc.net

History
- Founded: 1829

Architecture
- Functional status: In use

Adelaide Place Baptist Church is a Scottish Baptist church in the Charing Cross area of Glasgow. The name "Adelaide Place" is taken from the former name of this part of Bath Street. The church was founded in 1829 and the present church building dates from 1877. The church played an important place in the history of the Baptist churches in Scotland, and also spearheaded many charitable and social care initiatives. It is affiliated with the Baptist Union of Scotland.

== History ==
Reverend James Paterson DD, the first pastor, started the church in a rented room on North Portland Street, Glasgow in 1829. Due to the growth of the congregation, the church moved to a large hall in Inkle Factory Lane, and then in 1835 to a church building they had commissioned on Hope Street, Glasgow. The Hope Street building is now part of Glasgow Central Station. The church then commissioned a new building on Adelaide Place (now part of Bath Street) in the 1870s. The congregation moved into the new building in 1876. Another branch of the church was established in the early 1880s on St Clair Street, Maryhill.

=== Contribution to education ===
While still in Hope Street, the church provided evening classes in elementary education. These classes were gradually phased out with the introduction of a compulsory public education system in Scotland. Dr. Paterson was one of the founders of the Glasgow Commercial College in 1846. The college aimed to provide a university-level commercial education to young businessmen. Paterson himself taught Logic and Rhetoric and the college also taught Political Economy and other subjects. It met in the Anderson Buildings on George Street, Glasgow. The college later merged with the Glasgow Athenaeum, which was the ancestor of the University of Strathclyde.

The Baptist Theological College was founded in 1894, and until 1925 it was housed within Adelaide Place Baptist Church. The first president was Professor Joseph Coats MD who was a deacon of Adelaide Place for many years. Three early pastors of the church also served as tutors at the college: Dr. James Paterson, Dr. James Culross and Dr. T. H. Martin. More recently, Jack Quinn (pastor from 1984 to 2013) tutored at the college.

=== Baptist Union of Scotland ===
In 1870, the Baptist Union of Scotland was formed of 51 churches in the hall of Hope Street Chapel (which later moved to Adelaide Place). Howard Bowser, a former deacon and treasurer of Hope Street Chapel, became president of the Baptist Union in 1871 and the philanthropist Thomas Coats (1809–1883) took over the presidency in 1873.

Adelaide Place was for many years the centre of denomination activity for Baptists in Scotland, with the annual Baptist Assembly often being held on the premises. Because of this role, and the fact that APBC founded many daughter churches, it was described by the Evening Citizen newspaper as "the Cathedral Church of the Baptists in the West of Scotland."

=== World Wars and interwar years ===
Twenty men from Adelaide Place and a further 17 from the St. Clair Street branch (near Maryhill Road) were killed in the First World War. Six men from Adelaide Place were killed in the Second World War. The names of the fallen from both wars are inscribed on a commemorative communion table.

The St Clair Street Women's Fellowship started two sewing meetings to make up comfort packages for church members on active service. Some female members of the congregation volunteered to help with air raid precautions, and Marjorie McInnes regularly carried out fire-watch duties from the church roof during blackout.

During the war, the main church building was open to the public every day for meditation and prayer. The BBC broadcast to the Empire a radio programme of a church service held in Adelaide Place on 9 March 1941.

In 1933, £2,500 was raised to carry out repairs to the stonework of the church, which had been damaged by smoke pollution, and to make improvements to the St Clair Street Halls, the manse and the Church Officer's house.

=== Post-war period ===
St Clair Street Women's Fellowship had been set up at the St Clair Street location as a response to female hardship during the years of the Great Depression. It continued until 1952, when the project was closed and the St Clair Street building sold, due to the reduced population of Glasgow city centre as people moved out to the new suburbs.

The depopulation of the city centre placed pressure upon the church, as a smaller congregation struggled with the costs of the church building and activities. In the 1950s and 1960s the church discussed the possibility of merging with another city centre church or moving out of the city centre, but decided against both options. In the 1970s, the church set up the Adelaide Place Baptist Church Development Trust to coordinate a renovation project. The stonework was cleaned, a new heating system was installed, carpet was laid and the church was rewired.

In 1974, Rev. Donald McCallum was so moved by a meeting with a homeless woman that, with some volunteers, he opened a flat to house and care for vulnerable young women in the vicinity of the church. In 1982, a charitable trust was set up to run the initiative. Rev. McCallum named it the Elpis Centre after the Greek word for 'hope'. The Elpis Centre now offers accommodation and support to around 18 vulnerable women at any one time.

=== Renovation in the 1990s ===
Dry rot was discovered in the building in the early 1990s. Once again, there were discussions about closing the building and moving the congregation to the suburbs because of the expense of repairs. The congregation instead decided on extensive renovation and redevelopment programme, incorporating businesses that could feed their profits back into the work of the church. Adelaide Place Development Company Ltd (SC142177), with the trading name 'Adelaides', was set up in 1993 to oversee the business, and work commenced in 1994. The eastern part of the church was converted into a guest house, the basement into a nursery, and a mezzanine cafe was set up with access from Bath Street. The main auditorium was also made available for hire at times when it was not being used by the congregation. The cafe was later closed, with the facilities being used by the guest house and nursery instead.

=== Light of Renewal project ===
The church carried out another renovation project, named 'The Light of Renewal', in 2017- 2023. The building's external stonework was repaired in 2017. The guest house was closed in 2018 and the bedrooms and reception office were converted back to offices and meeting rooms for the church. The audiovisual system was also updated in 2018. The main auditorium was renovated in 2022 - 2023, with the installation of a community cafe space, re-glazing of the windows and improvements to disabled access. The nursery closed in February 2025.

== Building ==
Adelaide Place Baptist Church was built between 1875 and 1877 and was designed by Thomas Lennox Watson. Its entrances are at 209 Bath Street and 188 Pitt Street, Glasgow. At the Pitt Street entrance, a stone staircase leads up to three double doors, while the Bath Street entrance has street-level access.

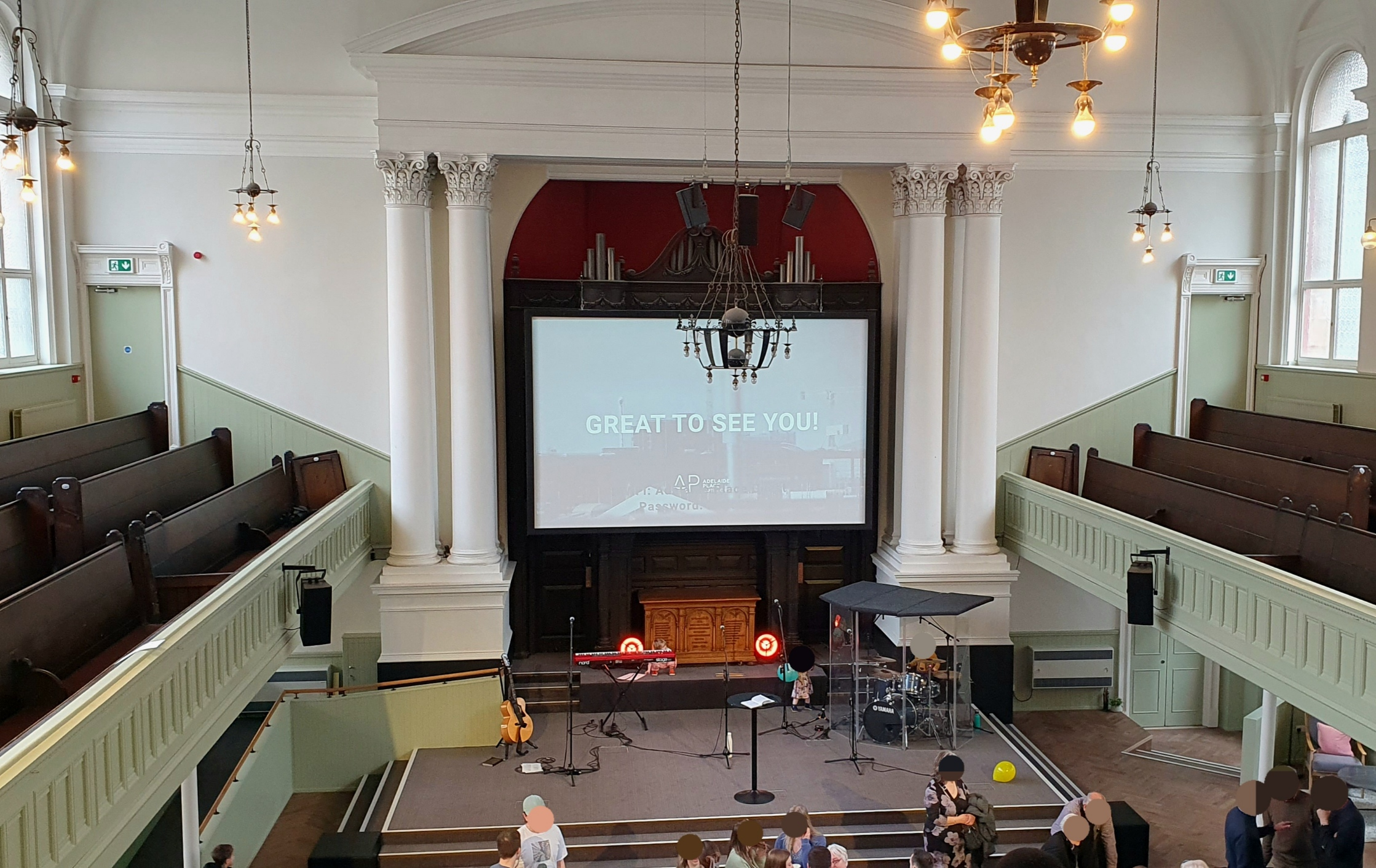
Adelaide Place Baptist Church - view from balcony

The church is built in the neo-classical Italianate style from polished blonde ashlar stone. It has a raised temple front on Pitt Street, with Corinthian columns supporting a pediment, three recessed doorways with panelled outer doors and glass inner doors.

The front is flanked by pedimented blocks on either side. There are sash and case windows and arcaded windows with outer pilasters on both elevations (Bath Street and Bath Lane).

The auditorium has a balcony at the back and both sides of the space, supported by pillars. At the front of the auditorium there is a platform with access ramp and steps, flanked by columns and topped with a rounded pediment. There was previously a baptistery under the stage but this was removed during refurbishment in 2022. Many of the pipes of the former pipe organ, set in dark wood, are still present behind the platform.

There are three stained glass windows by W. and J. J. Kerr in the west wall, above the balcony. They show Christ and the Wise Virgins; Timothy and his Mother; Paul and Isaiah. Christ and the Wise Virgins was dedicated by James Wilson, Provost of Govan, in memory of his sister-in-law Victoria Graham Taylor who died in 1873 at the age of 19. Timothy and his Mother was dedicated by one Herman Bowser in memory of his wife and son. They were described by the North British Daily Mail as being in 'the first rank of modern works.'

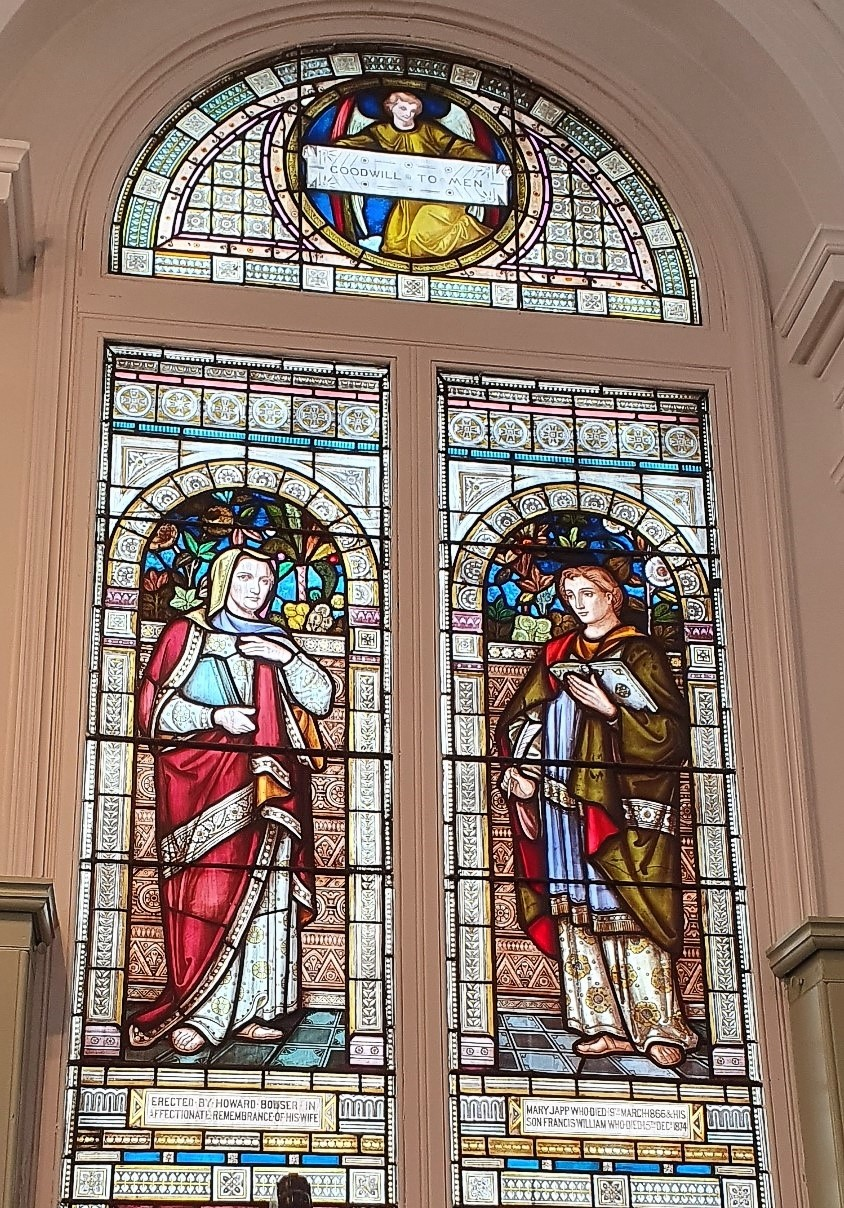
Stained glass window 'Timothy and his Mother'

It is a Category B listed building.

== List of pastors ==
Name	Term of Service
James Paterson	1829–1880
Samuel Chapman	1870–1877
James Culross	1878–1883
D. P. MacPherson	1883–1887
T. H. Martin	1888–1918
T. N. Tattersall	1921–1924
J. E. Roberts	1925–1929
R. W. Waddelow	1931–1947
F. G. Hastings	1948–1952
George Armstrong Young	1952–1968
Donald P. McCallum	1970–1982
John (Jack) Quinn	1984–2013
Stephen Crothers	2012– present

Associate pastors

Name	Term of Service
Paul Gardiner	1975–1978
Ronnie Hall	2007–2011

== Notable members ==
Robert Kettle (1761–1852). President of the Scottish Temperance League and editor of the Scottish Temperance Journal.

William Quarrier (1829–1903). Deacon at Hope Street Hall. Quarrier was a philanthropist who founded Orphan Homes of Scotland, which later became the charity Quarriers.

Joseph Coats (1848–1899), pathologist. Coats was a deacon of the church and also the first president of the Baptist Theological College.

Sir Adam Nimmo (1866–1939), colliery owner. A member of APBC for almost 50 years, serving as a deacon, senior trustee and treasurer.

Marjorie McInnes OBE (1917–2015). Deacon and later honorary deacon. The only woman ever to be elected President of the Baptist Union of Scotland. Chief Welfare Officer for Scotland. As a contributor to the Cope Report, she was jointly responsible for the establishment of social work as a profession in Scotland.

== Daughter churches ==
As the membership of Adelaide Place Baptist Church increased, groups of members sometimes founded new congregations in areas of Glasgow with large or growing populations that did not yet have a Baptist church.

In 1845 a church was formed in Blackfriars Street (later called John Knox Street) by members of the Hope Street Hall (later Adelaide Place Baptist Church). The building was designed by Thomas Lennox Watson, who also designed the Adelaide Place building. John Knox Street Baptist Church was demolished in 1965.

The congregation of Queens Park Baptist Church was formed in 1878 by four members of Adelaide Place Baptist Church, to serve the needs of the growing suburb of Queens Park on Glasgow's south side. This church decided to commission the present church building in 1884 and moved into the new premises in 1887.

Hillhead Baptist Church was formed in 1883 by a group from Adelaide Place who lived in the area. This building was also designed by Thomas Lennox Watson. Sixteen years later, in 1899, Hillhead Baptist Church founded Partick Baptist Church.

Members from Hillhead Baptist Church and Adelaide Place Baptist Church started meeting in Bearsden in 1973. The congregation became Bearsden Baptist Church, which first called a minister in 1975.

Queens Park Baptist Church, Bearsden Baptist Church and Hillhead Baptist Church are still in operation, although the original Hillhead church building is being converted to flats. Partick Baptist Church is now a campus of Queens Park Baptist Church.

== The present congregation ==
The church has four staff members. The rest of the work of the church is carried out by eight teams of volunteers, each team serving a different function. Children's work in the church takes place during the service, led by volunteers from the APBC Kids team.

Adelaide Place Baptist Church is a registered Scottish charity (charity number SC013073) and members of the Core Leadership Team are also trustees of the charity.
