= Maybole Baptist Church =

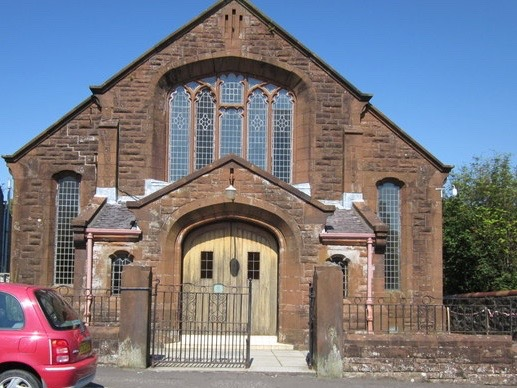
- Maybole Baptist Church, Ayrshire, Scotland
- Maybole Baptist Church
- 55.35358°N 4.68497°W
- Location: Maybole, Ayrshire
- Country: Scotland
- Denomination: Baptist Union of Scotland

History
- Status: Parish church
- Founded: 20th century
- Consecrated: 30 October 1914

Architecture
- Functional status: Closed
- Architect: Hugh Campbell
- Architectural type: Traditional gable with end projection porch

Specifications
- Capacity: 320 seats + 120 standing

Maybole Baptist Church was a Baptist church in Maybole, South Ayrshire, Scotland. It arose from a Maybole prayer group started in 1898 that was admitted to the Baptist Union of Scotland in 1901. The church building opened in 1914 and closed in 2020.

The church building features red sandstone, a traditional gable with projected front porch and arched doorway. Designed by architect Hugh Campbell (1863-1926) of Glasgow it is a recognized noteworthy building in Maybole and the wider Carrick area of southern Scotland. The church grounds feature minimal space due to a small plot size. Maybole town, within which the church is located, is also noted for distinctive architecture.

== Geography ==
Maybole Baptist Church was located at 14 Carrick Street, Maybole. Carrick Street lies immediately north of the A77 road which passes through Maybole. The church's National Grid Reference (NGR) is NS 29880 09900, Canmore ID is 203792 and Site ID is NS20NE 60.

== History ==
=== 19th century ===
It is estimated new Christian congregations in Scotland increased from a handful mid-nineteenth century to 184 assemblies in southern Scotland by 1900. Maybole was part of this trend. The setting for a Maybole Baptist Church further benefited from the new Baptist Union for Scotland, formed in 1869, the "Maybole Revival," an evangelist movement during the 1870s, which also published "The Maybole Evangelist" magazine, a new Maybole Presbyterian Church opened in 1880, a Baptist Theological College established in Glasgow in the 1890s, and flourishing missionary work in the expanding British Empire.

Nineteenth century industrialization also impacted Maybole, with the town seeing much new manufacturing of agricultural implements and shoes. This was significant because Baptist churches in Scotland attracted commercially active and middle class congregations. Some Maybole worshippers were also less open to the strict doctrine of older Maybole churches, for example the Church of Scotland stress on avoiding work on Sundays.

=== Early 20th century ===
Scotland's Baptist Union admitted Maybole Baptist Church in 1901, despite the lack of a church building. The Maybole Baptist Church established a building fund in 1903. Maybole Baptist Church arose from a prayer group of 17 parishioners, formed in the 1890s, a common start for churches at the time. Before the church opened the Maybole prayer group used private homes and the disused Maybole Methodist Church. Early leaders included Thomas Ramsay (1857-1934).

=== Great War (1914–18) ===
Maybole Baptist Church opened on 30 October 1914, two months after the Great War started, eleven years after construction started. It was described as "The Youngest Church in Maybole" with seating for 320 and standing room for 120. Construction cost £1,720, on a self-funding basis by the congregation. As comparison, the nearby Maybole Library was built in the same decade for £2,500, based on one donation from American philanthropist Andrew Carnegie. Even though the church's first pastor, Thomas Ramsay, and other elders made personal donations Maybole Baptist Church carried debt for some time. The retiring first pastor made a further gift of a manse in 1919, citing the Great War as motivation.

=== Interwar era (1918–1939) ===
During and after the Great War, members of Maybole Baptist Church supported a "daughter church" in Girvan, 19 km to the south. This emerged from a Girvan prayer group, established in 1907. The Girvan Baptist Church opened in 1920, closed in 2001 and was destroyed by fire in 2013.

The inaugural pastor of Maybole Baptist Church, Thomas Ramsay, was elected President of the Baptist Union of Scotland in 1921.

Maybole Baptist Church installed electricity within the church building in 1935, which is marked by a memorial plaque. The registered congregation numbered 105 in the 1930s, a high point, after which congregations declined, in line with Scotland-wide declines in Baptist congregations.

=== Post World War 2 (1945–) ===
Up to the 1950s, Maybole Baptist Church admitted 404 people to the Baptist Union, and up to the 1960s, it baptized 288 people. Although congregations declined from the 1930s peak some modest increase in attendance at Baptist churches within Scotland happened in the late 20th century.
