= Joseph Coats =

Scottish pathologist (1848–1899)

- Joseph Coats 1899
- Born: 4 February 1848; Paisley
- Died: 24 January 1899 (aged 50); 8 University Gardens, Glasgow.
- Education: University of Glasgow
- Scientific career
- Fields: Pathology

Joseph Coats (4 February 1848 – 24 January 1899) was a pathologist and emeritus professor of Pathology at the University of Glasgow. Coats wrote the first book on practical pathology, that became the bible of the profession.

== Life ==
Coats was the son of William Coats and the grand-nephew of Thomas Coats family in Paisley, who were famous as thread manufacturers. Coats was educated at Paisley Grammar School before matriculating at the University of Glasgow on a arts course. However after two years, he changed faculty, against the wishes of his father. He started a medical degree at the University of Glasgow Medical School. During his third-year course, he contracted Typhus after visiting Paisley Infirmary during his holidays. In 1867 Coats graduated MB with honours.

Coats was a deeply religious man, a Protestant, who believed in Sabbatarianism. He was a deacon of Adelaide Place Baptist Church and the first president of the Baptist Theological College.

== Career ==
Coat's first career position as a physician was as an assistant to William Tennant Gairdner at the Glasgow Royal Infirmary. He subsequently moved to University of Leipzig, to work with German physiologist Carl Ludwig and learn experimental physiology. Coats returned to Glasgow in 1869 and was appointed to the position in the Royal Infirmary as Pathologist. Upon his appointment to the Royal, he took at trip to Germany to train with German pathologist Eduard von Rindfleisch at the University of Würzburg. While at the Royal, Coats specialised in Morbid anatomy and Histology. He also ensured the infirmary pathological museum was added to with new specimen's and this work led to him compiling and publishing the first catalogue of the collection in 1872. A second catalogue was published by 1878, the third publishing in 1889. In 1875, Coats was appointed to the Western Infirmary as a pathologist and continued to work in other appointments including pathologist to the Hospital for Sick Children, until his early death in 1899. The Board of the new Sick Children's Hospital appointed Dr Coats as pathologist in the initial set of appointments of honorary medical officers.

At the Western Infirmary, Coats worked built up the Glasgow School of Pathology. During that period, he also acted in capacity of the dispensary physician and spent significant time studying the diseases of the throat, to enable him to open a GP surgery to earn extra money. From 1877 he became an independent lecturer, as opposed to working at an assistant to a senior physician, when he started to teach practical pathology to four students. Two years later the number of students had grown to a dozen.

== Professor ==
Up until 1893, there was no professor of pathology at the University of Glasgow The university commissioners created the new Chair of Pathology at the end of 1893 and assigned it to Coats. Coming so late, Coats felt it was a mixed blessings. Although his lecture's were recognised as qualifying for the degree for a number of years, it wasn't until he joined the Western Infirmary that he became a lecturer. However, he lost his independence by the action of another professor, the Professor of the Institutes of Medicine, John Gray McKendrick who became the Regius Professor of Physiology (Glasgow) in 1876. His chair not only covered physiology but several others subjects, one of which included pathology. The professor insisted that only he could lecture on pathology, leaving Coats in the unenviable position of becoming his assistant. Being an assistant meant Coats had to pay McKendrick lecture fees on a yearly basis. Coats found this both galling and irksome, as McKendrick never held a single lecture on pathology, instead focusing his time only on physiology. When Coats was finally awarded the chair after so many years, his career as professor was cut short.

== Death ==
In 1896, he started to feel pain that resulted in febrile attacks that Coats suspected of being Malaria picked up while he was in Rome. However, a year later, a tumour was discovered in his abdomen. After a visit to Australia and Egypt in 1898, his health rapidly worsened in the last months of the year and he died during the morning of 24 January 1899.

== Bibliography ==
Coats was appointed editor of the Glasgow Medical Journal on 28 November 1877, at the time it was changing from a quarterly to a monthly publication. He was still the senior editor at his death, holding the position for twenty-one years.

In 1883, Coats published his manual of pathology. The first edition became the standard reference textbook for Pathologists. Further editions were written by Scottish pathologists Robert Muir his successor, later still by Daniel Fowler Cappell and so on.

- Coats, Joseph (1883). A Manual of pathology, by Joseph Coats, ... London: Longmans. OCLC 457820759.
- Gairdner, William Tennant; Coats, Joseph (1881). "Discussion on the pathology of phthisis pulmonalis". Glasgow Medical Journal. 15 (4). Glasgow: Alex MacDougall: 269–303. OCLC 11905341. PMC 5900255. PMID 30433503. Alt URL In 1898 Coats produced the book, Notes on Sea and Land. A personal diary. This was a journey he and his wife undertook to New Zealand etc. Oct 1897 to April 1898. for private circulation.
