= Baptist Union of Scotland =

Association of Baptist churches in Scotland

- Classification: Evangelical Christianity
- Theology: Baptist
- Polity: Congregationalist
- Associations: Baptist World Alliance; European Baptist Federation
- Region: Scotland
- Origin: 1869
- Congregations: 153
- Members: 9,952
- Ministers: 175
- Official website: scottishbaptist.com

The Baptist Union of Scotland is a Baptist Christian denomination in Scotland. It is affiliated with the Baptist World Alliance. The headquarters is north of the M8 in the Port Dundas areas of Glasgow.

== History ==
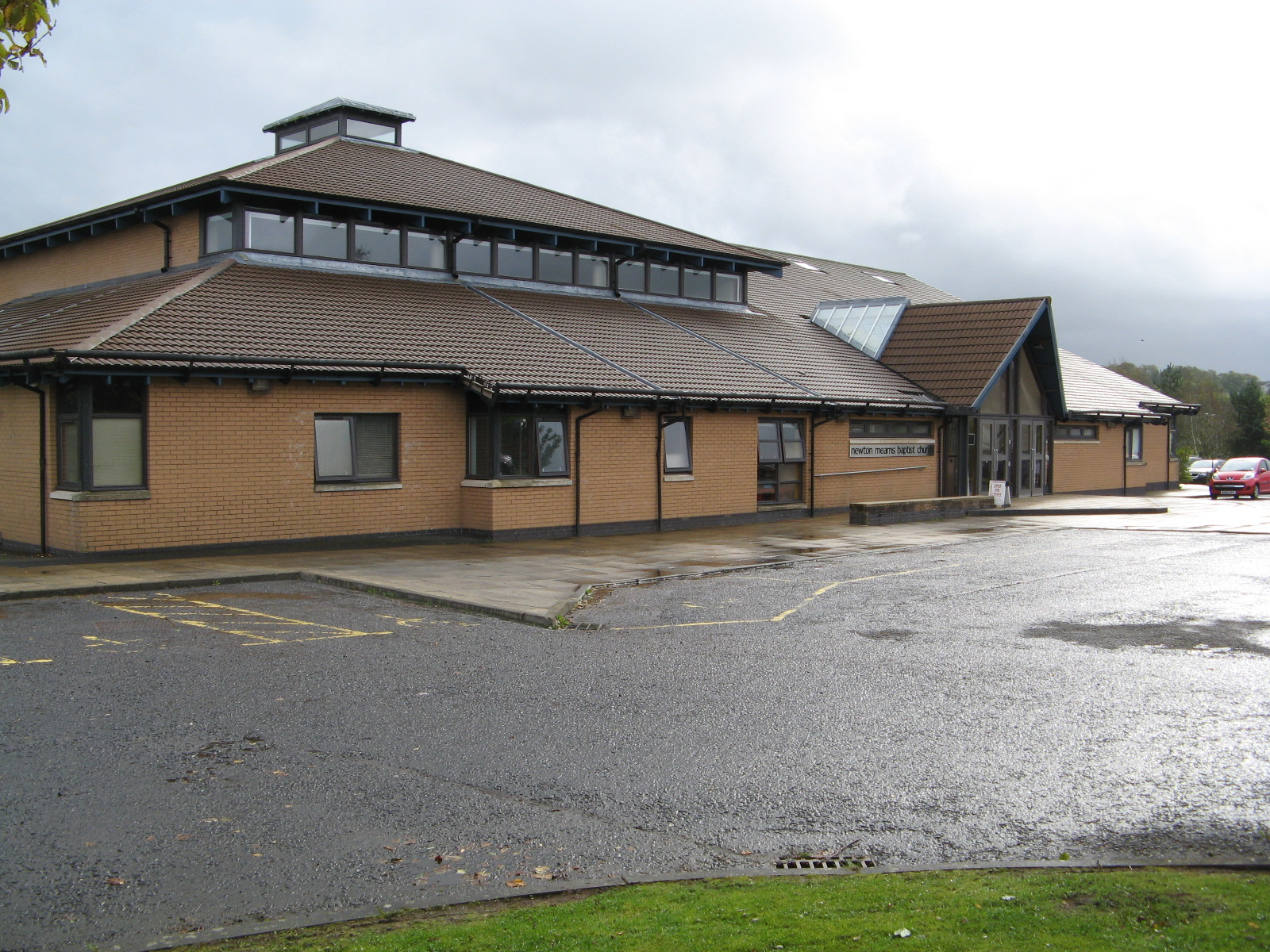
Newton Mearns Baptist Church in Glasgow.

=== From the 1650s to 1869 ===
Baptists first arrived in Scotland with the armies of English republican Oliver Cromwell in the 1650s, who established small churches in Leith, Perth, Cupar, Ayr and Aberdeen, but they did not survive for long, partly because of their association with Cromwell (who was generally not welcomed in Scotland), but more especially as a result of strident and often violent opposition instigated and inspired by the Church of Scotland and the Parliament of Scotland which it controlled. Baptists later emerged in the 18th century—in 1750 at Keiss, where the leader was William Sinclair and the church was established on the English Baptist pattern. The group who in Edinburgh came to Baptist convictions in 1765 under the leadership of Robert Carmichael and Archibald McLean became known as Scotch Baptists. Like other Scottish Protestant Christians of the time they were very conservative and adopted the opinions of a particularly strict form of Calvinism. Somewhat later, a different form of Baptist witness emerged, this time influenced by the Haldane brothers, James Haldane and Robert Haldane evangelical preachers who came to Baptist convictions around 1808. Along with the English Baptists, they were distinguished from the Scotch Baptists by their more moderate and less Calvinistic attitudes. After overcoming initial hostilities, all these groups were able to unite in 1869.

=== 1869 to the present day ===
The Baptist Union of Scotland was founded in Hope Street Chapel in Glasgow (later Adelaide Place Baptist Church) in 1869, with 51 churches in its membership, which represented almost 4000 members. One of its early presidents (in 1873) was the philanthropist Thomas Coats.

In 1999, the Union voted to permit the ordination of women. The first woman to lead a church in the Scottish Baptist Union was Rev. Catriona Gorton, who led Hillhead Baptist Church from 2009-2023. In 2003, Marjorie Taylor and Beth Dunlop became the first women accredited as ministers in the denomination.

Following on from the Covid Pandemic, the denomination strived to make 'increasing their membership in all 150 churches' their core vision through three strategic priorities of congregations and the denomination: prayer, church planting, and leaders' training.

In 2019, the congregation had 10,600 members and 158 churches. According to a census published by the association in 2023, it claimed 9,946 members and 156 churches. As of March 2025, the denomination had 9,452 members and 153 churches.

The Baptist Union of Scotland is served by a National team comprising: Rev Dr Martin Hodson (General Director), Rev. Lisa Holmes (Deeper Church Lead), Mr Brian Windram (Finance Director), Ms. Lyndsay Cameron-Ross (Communications Lead) Rev Ali Laing (Younger Generation & Digital Church Lead), Rev Professor Andrew Clarke (Leadership Development Lead) and Rev. Glenn Innes (Future Church Lead).

In 2022/2023, the denomination reported a growth in membership, of 1%, for the first time in 40 years. This was replicated in 2024. During 2023 and 2024, they were seeing about baptisms across their churches each year than they had in the years before the Covid pandemic. In 2023 they saw 334, and in 2024 they saw 417. Their hope and prayer is to see 40 new Baptist churches revitalised or planted by 2030. Initial work has begun in Denny, Dundee and Newton Mearns.

== Beliefs ==
The denomination has a Baptist confession of faith. It is a member of the Baptist World Alliance. It has been a member of the Evangelical Alliance since 1997.

== See also ==
- Religion in Scotland

== Bibliography ==
- Wardin, Albert W., ed. (1995) Baptists Around the World: a comprehensive handbook. Nashville, Tenn: Broadman & Holman ISBN 0-8054-1076-7
- McBeth, H. Leon (1987) The Baptist Heritage: Four Centuries of Baptist Witness. Nashville, Tenn: Broadman Press
- Murray, Derek Boyd (1969) The First Hundred Years: the Baptist Union of Scotland. Glasgow: Baptist Union of Scotland
- Bebbington, David W., ed. (1988) The Baptists in Scotland: a History. Glasgow: Baptist Union of Scotland
