= List of Baptist confessions of faith =

Since the early days of the Baptist tradition, denominations have adopted common statements of faith as the basis for interdependency and cooperativity among the local churches.

Among the Baptist confessions of faiths, the 1689 Baptist Confession of Faith is subscribed to by a consensus of Reformed Baptists (Particular Baptists). The Orthodox Creed is widely accepted by General Baptists (1678).

The following is a comprehensive list of declarations and confessions of faith:

== 17th century ==
- 1611 Helwys Declaration of Faith (General Baptist)
- 1644 First London Confession of Faith - revised in 1646, 1651, and 1652 (Particular Baptist)
- 1651 The Faith and Practice of Thirty Congregations (General Baptist)
- 1654 The True Gospel-Faith Declared According to the Scriptures (Particular Baptist)
- 1655 Midlands Confession of Faith (Particular Baptist)
- 1656 Somerset Confession of Faith (Particular Baptist)
- 1660 Standard Confession of Faith - revised in 1663 and 1691 (General Baptist)
- 1677 Second London Confession of Faith - revised in 1689 (Particular Baptist)
- 1679 Orthodox Creed (General Baptist)
- 1691 Short Confession (Particular Baptist)

== 18th century ==
- 1729 The Goatyard Declaration of Faith (Particular Baptist)
- 1742 Philadelphia Confession of Faith (Particular Baptist)
- 1757 Carter Lane Declaration of Faith (Particular Baptist)
- 1758 Sandy Creek Confession of Faith (Particular Baptist)
- 1770 Articles of Religion of the New Connexion (Particular Baptist)
- 1788 The Coalheaver's Confession of Faith (Particular Baptist)

== 19th century ==
- 1833 New Hampshire Confession of Faith (Particular Baptist)
- 1834 A Treatise on the Faith of the Freewill Baptists (General Baptist)
- 1858 The Abstract of Principles (Particular Baptist)
- 1866 Compend of Christian Doctrines Held by Baptists (Particular Baptist)
- 1878 The Articles of Faith of the Gospel Standard Aid and Poor Relief Societies (Particular Baptist)

== 20th century ==
- 1900 Fulton Confession of Faith (Particular Baptist)
- 1923 Articles of Faith Put Forth by the Baptist Bible Union (Particular Baptist)
- 1925 Baptist Faith and Message - revised in 1963, 1998 and 2000 (Although originating from a Particular Baptist heritage, the Baptist Faith and Message, as variously revised, is theologically broad enough to include both General Baptists and Particular Baptists)
- 1935 Treatise on the Faith and Practice of the Free Will Baptists (General Baptist)
- 1966 Baptist Affirmation of Faith 1966 (Particular Baptist)
- 1985 Doctrinal Statement of the Brazilian Baptist Convention (General Baptist)
