= Baptists =

Denomination of Protestant Christianity

Baptists are a Protestant tradition of Christianity distinguished by baptizing only believers (believer's baptism) and doing so by total immersion. Modern Baptist churches generally subscribe to the doctrines of soul competency (the responsibility and accountability of every person before God), sola fide (justification by faith alone), sola scriptura (the Bible as the sole infallible authority) and congregationalist ecclesiastical polity (each local congregation governs itself). Baptists generally recognize at least two sacraments or ordinances: Baptism and the Lord's Supper.

Diverse from their beginnings, those identifying as Baptists today may differ widely from one another in what they believe, how they worship, their attitudes toward other Christians, and their understanding of what is important in Christian discipleship. Baptist missionaries have spread various Baptist churches to every continent. The largest Baptist communion of churches is the Baptist World Alliance, and there are many different groupings of Baptist churches and Baptist congregations.

Baptists are traced back to Dissenters from the Church of England in Great Britain. A nonconformist church was formed in Gainsborough led by the cleric John Smyth. The Gainsborough congregation and the Scrooby congregation went into exile in Amsterdam in 1608. In accordance with their interpretation (exegesis) of the New Testament, they came to reject infant baptism and instituted baptism only of professing believers. Thomas Helwys returned the congregation to England, where he formulated a distinctive philosophical request that the church and the state be kept separate in matters of law, so that individuals might have liberty of conscience. Baptists spread across England, where the General Baptists considered Christ's atonement to extend to all people, while the Particular Baptists believed that it extended only to the elect (in which there is no consensus who is included). The Second London Confession of Faith of 1689 is the greatest creedal document for Particular Baptists, whereas the Orthodox Creed of 1679 is the one widely accepted by General Baptists.

== Origins ==
Baptist historian Bruce Gourley outlines four main views of Baptist origins:

1. the modern scholarly consensus is that the denomination traces its origins to the 17th century English Dissenters, having minimal to no Anabaptist influence;
2. the view that it was an outgrowth of the Anabaptist movement begun in 1525 on Continental Europe;
3. the successionist view, which argues that Baptist churches actually existed in an unbroken chain outside of the mainstream Church since the time of Jesus Christ.
4. the perpetuity view, similar to the successionist view, which assumes that the Baptist faith and practice has existed since the time of Jesus Christ.

=== English Dissenters view ===
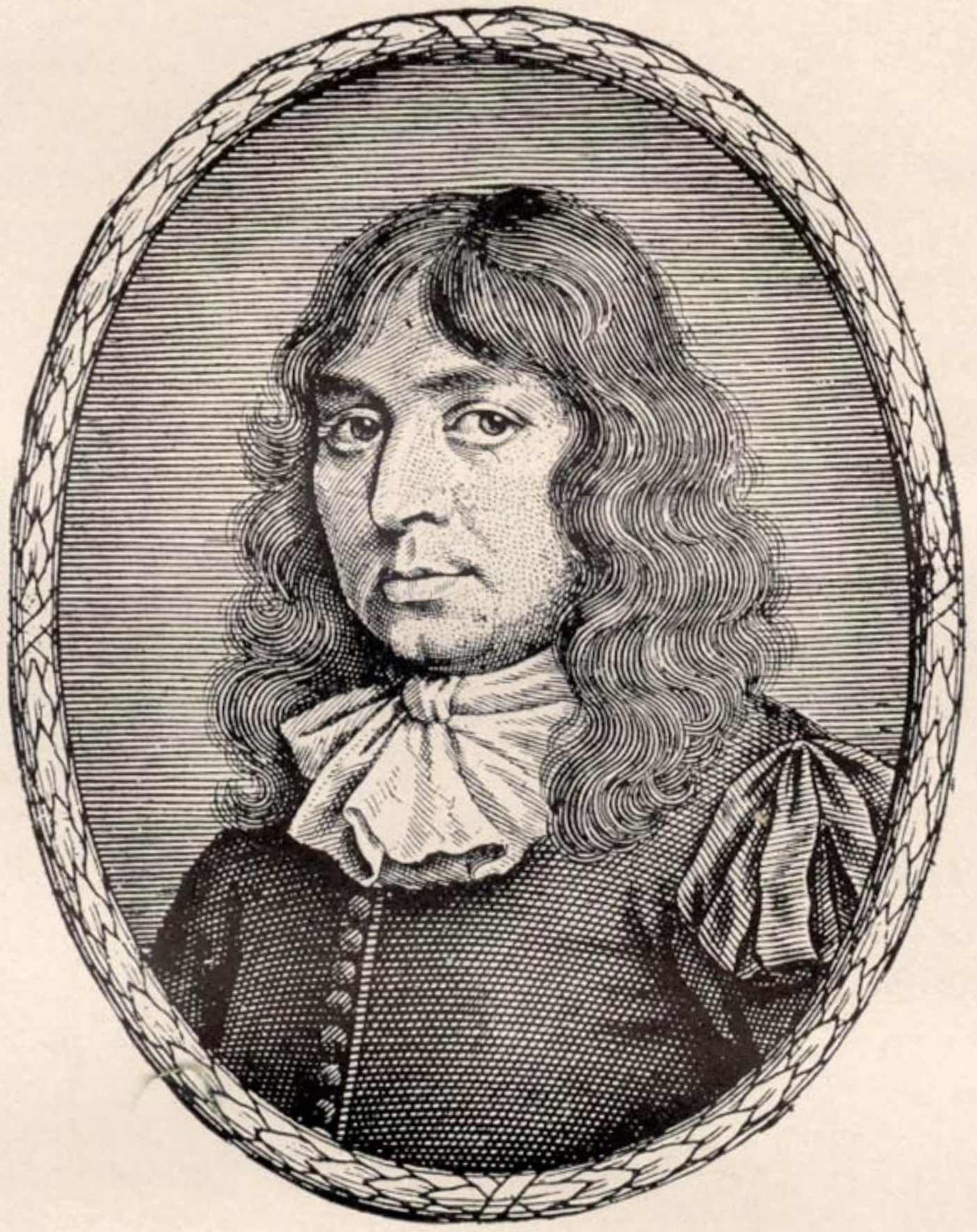
John Smyth led the first Baptist church in Amsterdam in 1609.

Baptist churches trace their history to English Dissenters, in 17th century England, 75 years after the formation of the Church of England, during the English Protestant Reformation. This view of Baptist origins is the most historically accurate and is widely accepted. It was a time of considerable political and religious turmoil. Both individuals and churches were willing to give up their theological roots if they became convinced that a more biblical "truth" had been discovered.

During the Reformation, the Church of England (Anglicans) separated from the Roman Catholic Church. There were some Christians who were not content with the achievements of the mainstream Protestant Reformation. There also were Protestants who were disappointed that the Church of England had not made corrections of what some considered to be errors and abuses, being the most critical of the church's direction. They became known as "Puritans". Most Puritans in the 16th century were conformists, staying in the Anglican Church and trying to make constructive changes from within. Other Puritans left the established church because of this Puritan dissatisfaction, and these became known as Separatists, Dissenters, or Nonconformists.

In 1579, Faustus Socinus founded the Unitarian Polish Brethren in Poland-Lithuania, which was a tolerant country. The Unitarians taught baptism by immersion. After their expulsion from the Commonwealth in 1658, many of them fled to the Netherlands. In the Netherlands, the Unitarians introduced immersion baptism to the Dutch Mennonites.

Baptist churches have their origins with John Smyth, Thomas Helwys, and John Murton in the Kingdom of England and the Dutch Republic. Because they shared beliefs with the Congregationalists, they went into exile in 1608 with other believers who held the same positions. They believe that the Bible is to be the primary guide and that credobaptism is what the Bible teaches. In 1609, the year considered to be the foundation of the Baptist tradition, these exiled Dissenters baptized believers and their church became the first Baptist church.

In 1609, while still there, Smyth wrote a tract titled "The Character of the Beast". In it he expressed two propositions: first, infants are not to be baptized; and second, unbelievers are to be admitted into the true Church by baptism." Hence, his conviction was that a scriptural church should consist only of regenerate believers who had been baptized confessing faith and past sins. They rejected the doctrine of infant baptism.

Shortly thereafter, in 1610, Smyth was expelled from the church. Ultimately, Smyth became committed to believers' baptism as the only biblical baptism. He was convinced on the basis of his interpretation of Scripture that infants would not be damned if they died in infancy. Smyth, convinced that his self-baptism was invalid, applied with the Waterland Mennonites for union. He died before achieving it, and some of his supporters became Mennonites. Helwys and Murton others kept their commitment to credobaptism that would originate in the Baptist tradition. The modern Baptist denomination is an outgrowth of the Amsterdam English church. Baptists rejected the name "Anabaptist" (literally, 're-baptizer') when they were called that by opponents in derision because they considered Anabaptists as heretics. McBeth writes that as late as the 18th century, many Baptists referred to themselves as "the Christians commonly—though falsely—called Anabaptists."

Helwys took over the leadership, leading the church back to England in 1612, and he published the first Baptist confession of faith: the Helwys Declaration of Faith, or "A Declaration of Faith of English People", in 1611. He settled the church in Spitalfields, East London, in 1612. It became known as the first General Baptist church.

Another milestone in the early development of the Baptist tradition was in 1638 with John Spilsbury, a Calvinist minister who later helped to promote the practice of baptism by immersion (as opposed to affusion or aspersion). According to Tom Nettles, professor of historical theology at Southern Baptist Theological Seminary, "Spilsbury's cogent arguments for a gathered, disciplined congregation of believers baptized by immersion as constituting the New Testament church gave expression to and built on insights that had emerged within separatism, advanced in the life of John Smyth and the suffering congregation of Thomas Helwys, and matured in Particular Baptists."

=== Anabaptist influence view ===
A minority view is that early 17th century Baptists were influenced by or even directly connected to continental Anabaptists. Representatives of this theory include A.C. Underwood and William R. Estep. Gourley writes that among some contemporary Baptist scholars, who emphasize the faith of the community over soul liberty, the Anabaptist theory is making a comeback. This view was also taught by the Reformed historian Philip Schaff. According to this view, Baptists shared common beliefs and practices with Dutch Waterlander Mennonites (one of many Anabaptist groups) including believer's baptism, belief in religious liberty and church-state separation, and similarities on soteriology.

It is certain that the Baptists in the Dutch Republic had contacts with the Mennonite Anabaptists, and John Smyth later even joined the Anabaptist movement, while those who remained as Baptists did so under Thomas Helwys. However, although it is possible that Helwys was subordinately influenced by Dutch Anabaptism, he still rejected multiple of their doctrines such as Melchiorite Christology and had a more high role for the civil magistrate. However, any influence Helwys and the General Baptists could have had would not necessarily translate to influence on Reformed Baptist theology, as although they share the same name, they are often viewed as having a distinct origin. Nevertheless, some historians have proposed for some Anabaptist influence on Reformed Baptists in addition to General Baptists, such as by proposing influence from a natively existing English Anabaptist population, rather than from Dutch Anabaptists. It has been sometimes speculated that a natively existing Anabaptist population in England gave rise to multiple English dissenting groups, including Particular Baptists. It has been noticed that there is some evidence for a native English Anabaptist population, and some historical records refer to two Anabaptists that were executed in England under Henry VII in 1575. However, many historians dismiss any links between the particular Baptists and Anabaptists, and there does not exist explicit evidences of Anabaptist influence on Particular Baptists.

Despite this, relations between Baptists and Anabaptists were early strained, which makes it difficult to support the Anabaptist view consensually. In 1624, the five existing Baptist churches of London issued an epistle of anathema to the Anabaptists for what they considered heresies, and throughout the centuries Baptists strongly rejected the nomenclature of "Anabaptist". Furthermore, the Gainsborough church exiled in Amsterdam, under Helwys' leadership, rejected unification with the Waterlander Anabaptists after a brief period of association; and Helwys exposed negatively their beliefs and practices, considering them as heretical. Nonetheless, many modern Baptists have much more positive views of Anabaptism, emphasizing the agreements in many core areas of theology.

=== Successionist and perpetuity view ===
Traditional Baptist historians write from the perspective that Baptists had existed since the time of Christ. Proponents of the Baptist successionist or perpetuity view consider the Baptist movement to have existed independently from Roman Catholicism and prior to the Protestant Reformation. This view has been characterized as "apologetic and polemical" and "without consideration of a critical, scientific methodology".

The perpetuity view is often identified with The Trail of Blood, a booklet of five lectures by James Milton Carroll published in 1931. Other Baptist writers who advocated the successionist theory of Baptist origins are John T. Christian and Thomas Crosby. This view was held by English Baptist preacher Charles Spurgeon as well as Jesse Mercer, the namesake of Mercer University. In 1898 William Whitsitt was pressured to resign his presidency of the Southern Baptist Theological Seminary for denying Baptist successionism.

=== Baptist origins in the United Kingdom ===
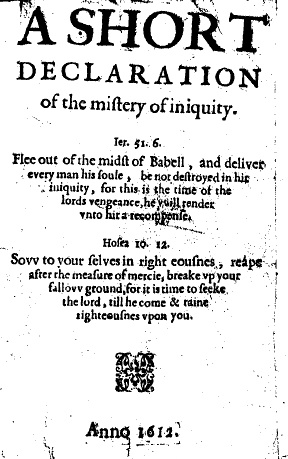
A Short Declaration of the Mistery of Iniquity (1612) by Thomas Helwys. For Helwys, religious liberty was a right for everyone, even for the heretics.

In 1612 Helwys returned to England and settled the Amsterdam church in London, to support the Puritan reforms. A number of Nonconformist Baptist churches were formed, and they became known as the General Baptists. The Particular Baptists were established when a group of Dissenters adopted credobaptism in the 1630s. The Particular Baptists consisted of seven churches by 1644 and had drafted up a confession of faith called the First London Confession of Faith. Many Particular Baptists are now called Grace Baptists.

=== Baptist origins in North America ===
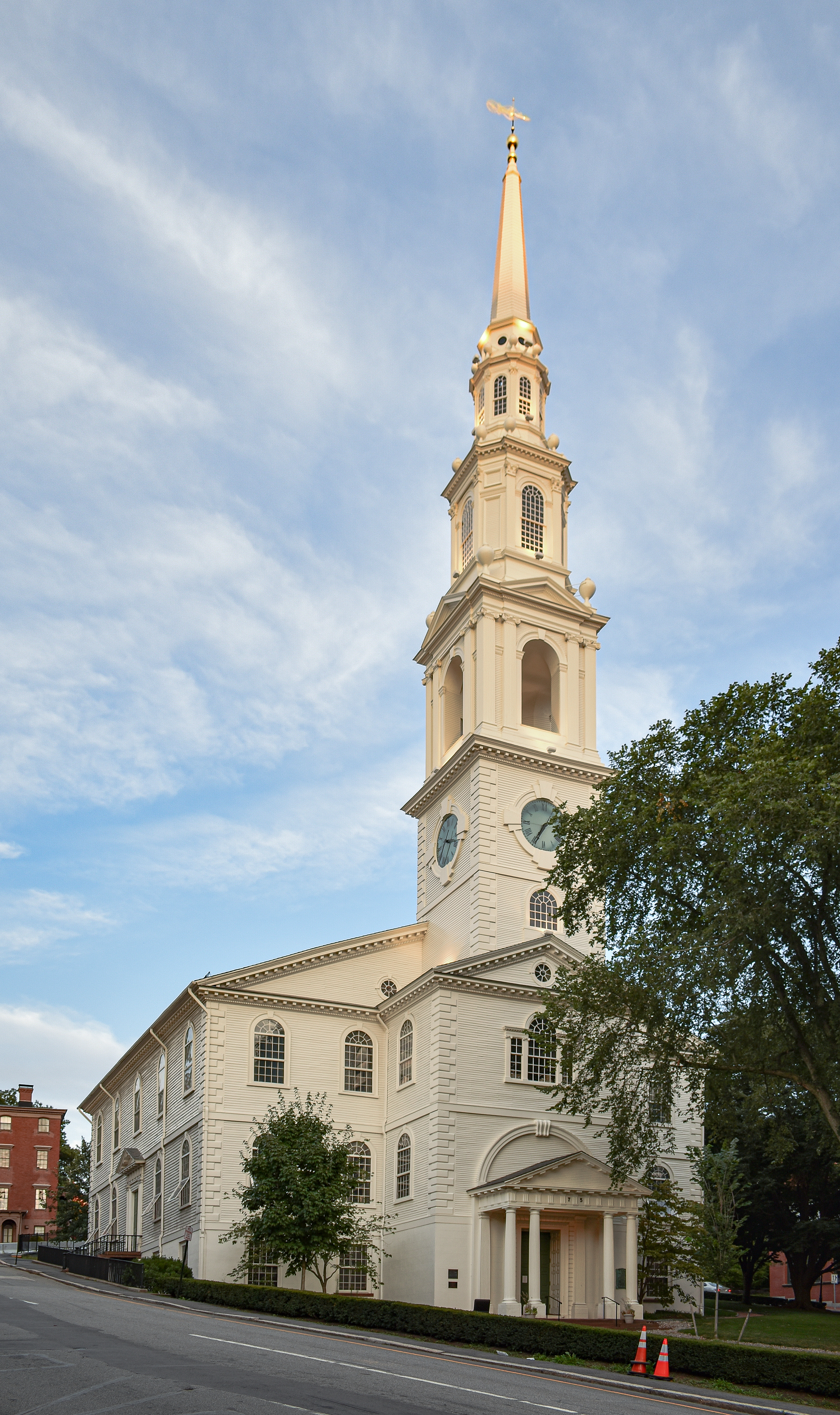
The First Baptist Church in America located in Providence, Rhode Island

Both Roger Williams and John Clarke are variously credited as founding the earliest Baptist churches in North America. In 1638 Williams established a Baptist church in Providence, Rhode Island, and Clarke established another Baptist church in Newport, Rhode Island. According to a Baptist historian who has researched the matter extensively, "There is much debate over the centuries as to whether the Providence or Newport church deserved the place of 'first' Baptist congregation in America. Exact records for both congregations are lacking."

The First Great Awakening of the 1740s energized the Baptists, where they experienced spectacular growth. Baptists became the largest Christian community in many southern states, including among the enslaved Black population.

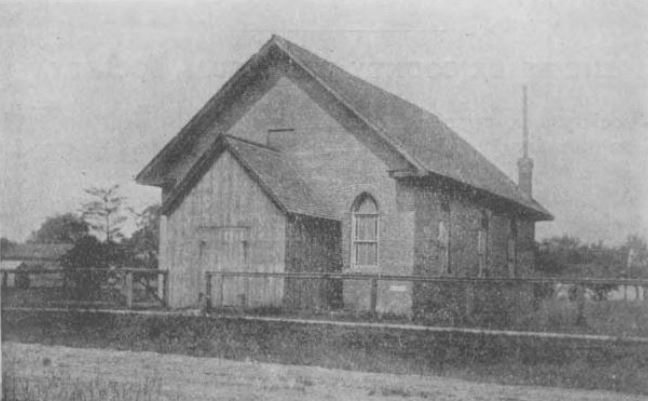
Early 20th century photo of the Sandwich First Baptist Church in Windsor, Ontario

Baptist missionary work in Canada began in the British colony of Nova Scotia (present day Nova Scotia and New Brunswick) in the 1760s. The first official record of a Baptist church in Canada was Horton Baptist Church (now Wolfville) in Wolfville, Nova Scotia on 29 October 1778. The church was established with the assistance of the New Light evangelist Henry Alline. Many of Alline's followers, after his death, converted and strengthened the Baptist presence in the Atlantic region. Two major groups of Baptists formed the basis of the churches in the Maritimes. These were referred to as Regular Baptist (Calvinist in their doctrine) and Free Will Baptists (Arminian in their doctrine).

In May 1845, many Baptist churches in the South of United States seceded from the Triennial Convention, the national Baptist organization established in 1814, over slavery. The Home Mission Society prevented slaveholders from being appointed as missionaries. These churches founded their own convention: the Southern Baptist Convention. The Triennial Convention remained mostly (though not entirely) northern in composition. The Triennial Convention was reorganized in 1907 as the now called American Baptist Churches USA (ABCUSA). In 2015, Baptists in the U.S. number 50 million people and constitute roughly one-third of American Protestants.

=== Baptist origins in Germany ===
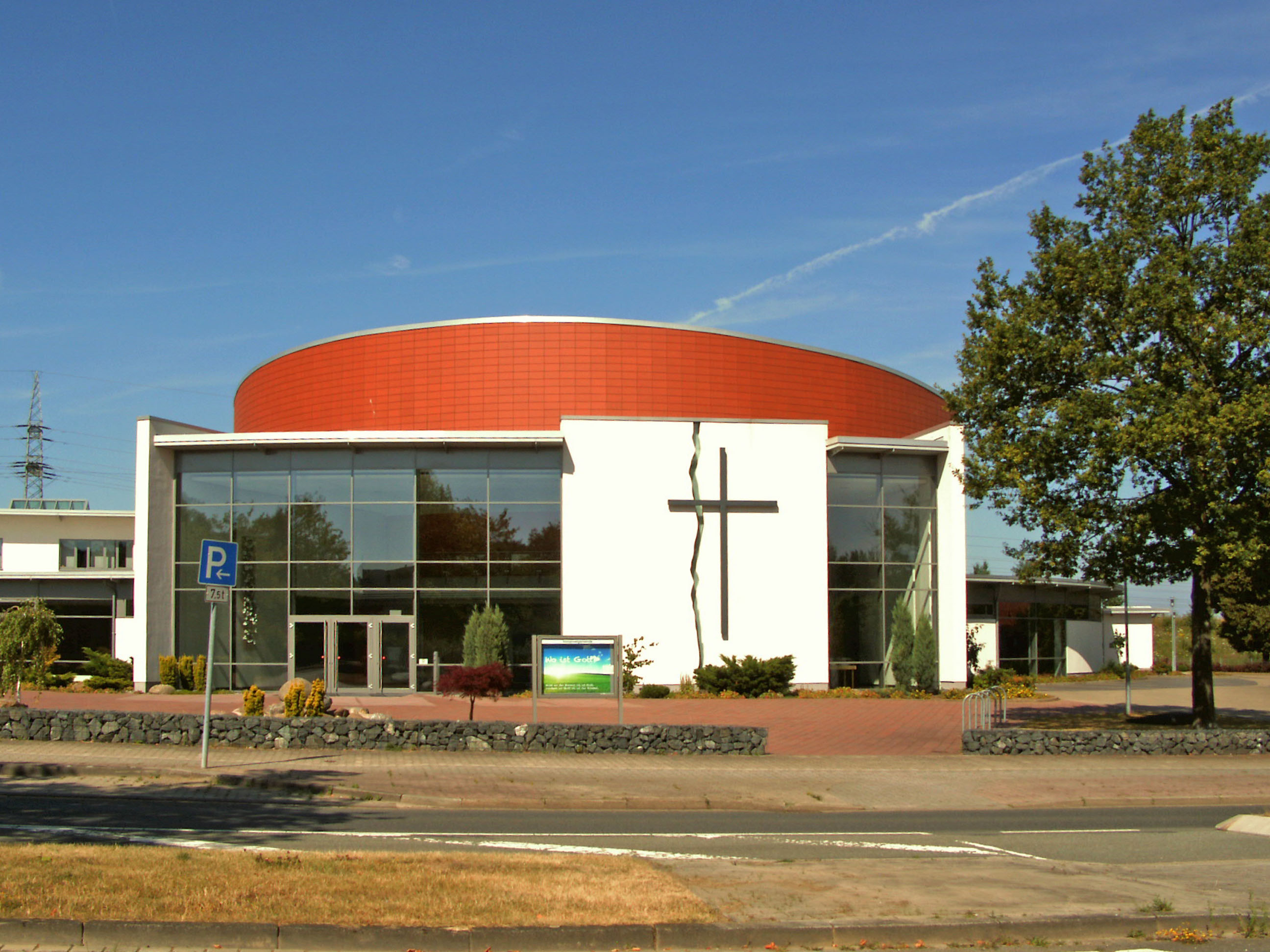
Emmanuel Baptist Church in Wolfsburg, Lower Saxony, affiliated with the Union of Evangelical Free Churches in Germany.

The first Baptist church in Hamburg, known as the Union of Evangelical Free Churches in Germany, was founded by the German missionary Johann Gerhard Oncken in 1834. Founded in 1849, the Union of United Congregations of Baptized Christians in Germany and Denmark merged in 1942 with the Union of Free Church Christians, which originated in the Brethren movement, and thereby took its present name. According to a census published by the association in 2023, it claimed 786 churches and 75,767 members.

The Evangeliumschristen-Baptisten ('Evangelical Christians-Baptists') are mostly of Russian-German origin. They were formed in 1944 from the merger of Evangeliums-Christen with the Baptists. Later, other evangelical free churches joined them. In contrast to their Eastern European countries of origin, no unified union of Evangelical Christians-Baptists was founded in Germany. Some of the newly formed congregations have come together in congregational associations such as Bruderschaft der Freien Evangeliums Christen Gemeinden ('the Brotherhood of Free Evangelical Christian Congregations') or the Arbeitsgemeinschaft evangelikaler Gemeinden ('Working Group of Evangelical Congregations'). Another part is connected with German Baptists through the Arbeitsgemeinschaft der Evangeliumschristen-Baptisten in the Union of Evangelical Free Churches or is united with Mennonite Brethren congregations in the Bund Taufgesinnter Gemeinden ('Union of Baptist-Minded Congregations'). In addition, there are also congregations outside of congregational associations. The congregations in the Bund Taufgesinnter Gemeinden ('Union of Baptist-Minded Congregations'; BTG) have partly Baptist, partly Mennonite roots. The federation was formed in 1989 from the merger of originally six Baptist-oriented congregations, which were primarily located in the region of Ostwestfalen-Lippe. The BTG has about 6000 members spread over 30 congregations. The Bibelseminar ('Bible seminary'), the theological training center of this association of congregations, is located in Bonn and offers a regular study program as well as a theological correspondence course and a theological evening school.

The International Baptist Convention goes back to church plantings by American soldiers. In Germany, 25 English-speaking congregations belong to it. From its beginnings in Wiesbaden and Frankfurt, a loose working group was formed in 1958, the Association of Baptists in Continental Europe, which was joined by other congregations and, from 1961, supported by the North American congregational association of the Southern Baptist Convention. In 1964, the Association adopted its current name.

=== Baptist origins in Finland ===
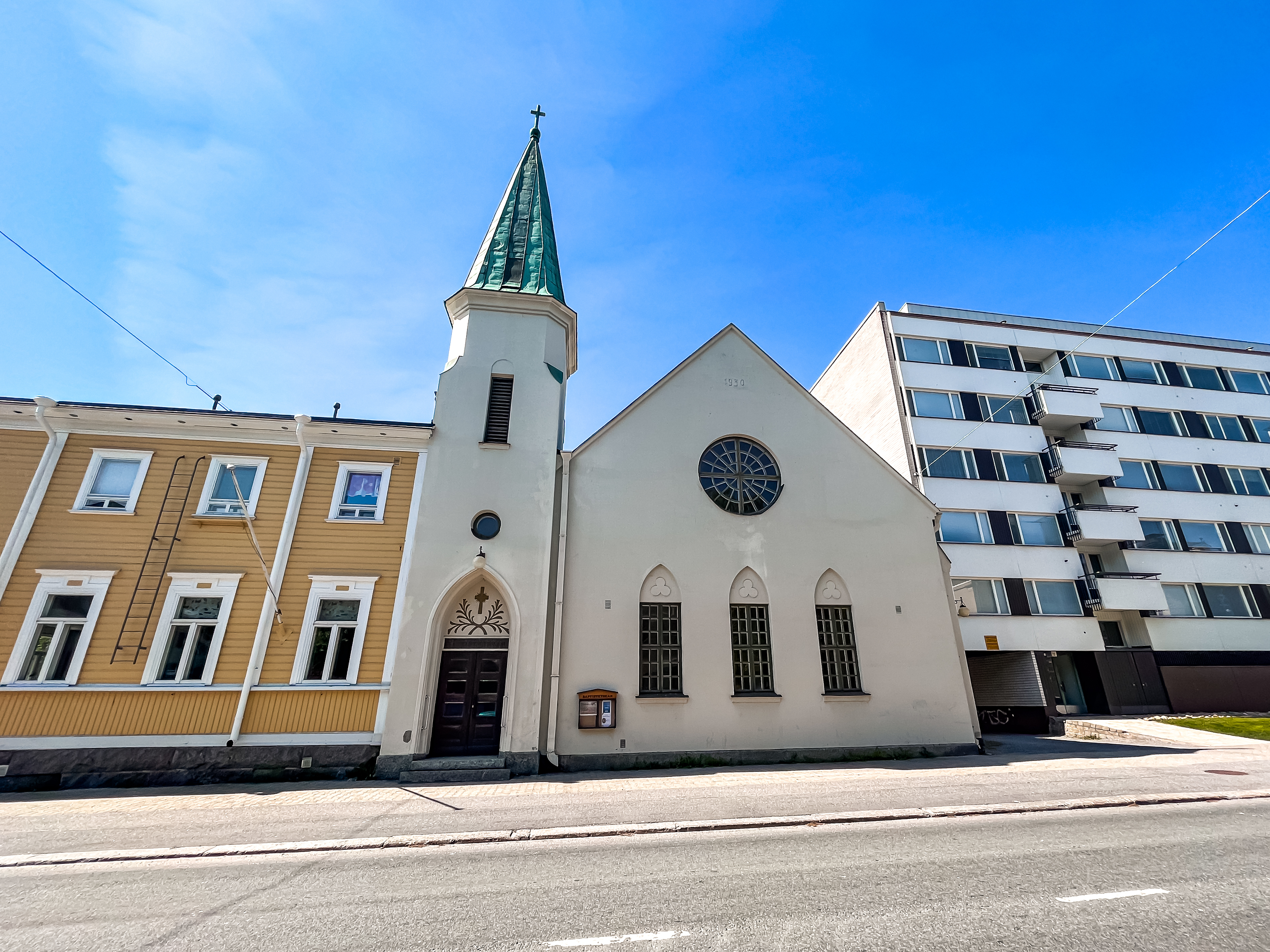
The Swedish Baptist Church in Vaasa, Finland, founded in 1881

Preacher Karl Justin Mathias Möllersvärd was the first to preach Baptist teachings in Finland and sparked a revival, though he did not stay long due to fierce opposition. The movement, however, continued to grow. In 1855, a resident of Åland returned from Stockholm with material about Baptist beliefs written by former Lutheran priest Anders Wiberg. Farmer Johan Erik Östling was inspired to travel to Stockholm the next year and be baptized, making him the first Finnish Baptist. Several baptisms were performed in Föglö, Åland the following year; they joined with those who had already been baptized in Sweden to found the first Finnish Baptist church in 1856 in Föglö.

Lutheran priest Henrik Heikel, who spoke with the Baptists to learn more about their beliefs, played a key role in the church's spread. Heikel moved to mainland Finland with his family in 1860. Pedersöre in Ostrobothnia was to become their home as he was installed as priest of the Lutheran church there. The family maintained contact with the Baptists in Åland; after his death in 1867, his son Viktor and daughter Anna were baptized as Baptists by Wiberg in Stockholm. Their conversions led to many more after Anna returned with literature and began to hold meetings. The family received a visit from a Baptist pastor, Adolf Herman Valén, who had been at the hearing with Heikel ten years earlier; they held meetings together and his preaching led to more conversions to the movement. He was the first Baptist to preach on the mainland. The first Baptist baptisms on the mainland were performed the same year, with Maria Ekqvist and Petter Stormåns being the first to be baptized. The movement continued to grow in the following years and a Swedish-speaking congregation was founded in Jakobstad (Finnish: Pietarsaari), near Pedersöre, in 1870, by thirteen people including four members of the Heikel family. That year, the Conventicle Act was also repealed in Finland. (In 1891 the Jakobstad Baptist church underwent a split due to differing views, particularly over open or closed communion.) Ostrobothnia has since remained a hub of the Baptist movement in Finland. Today, the only two Swedish-speaking Baptist churches outside the region are located in Helsinki and Karis.

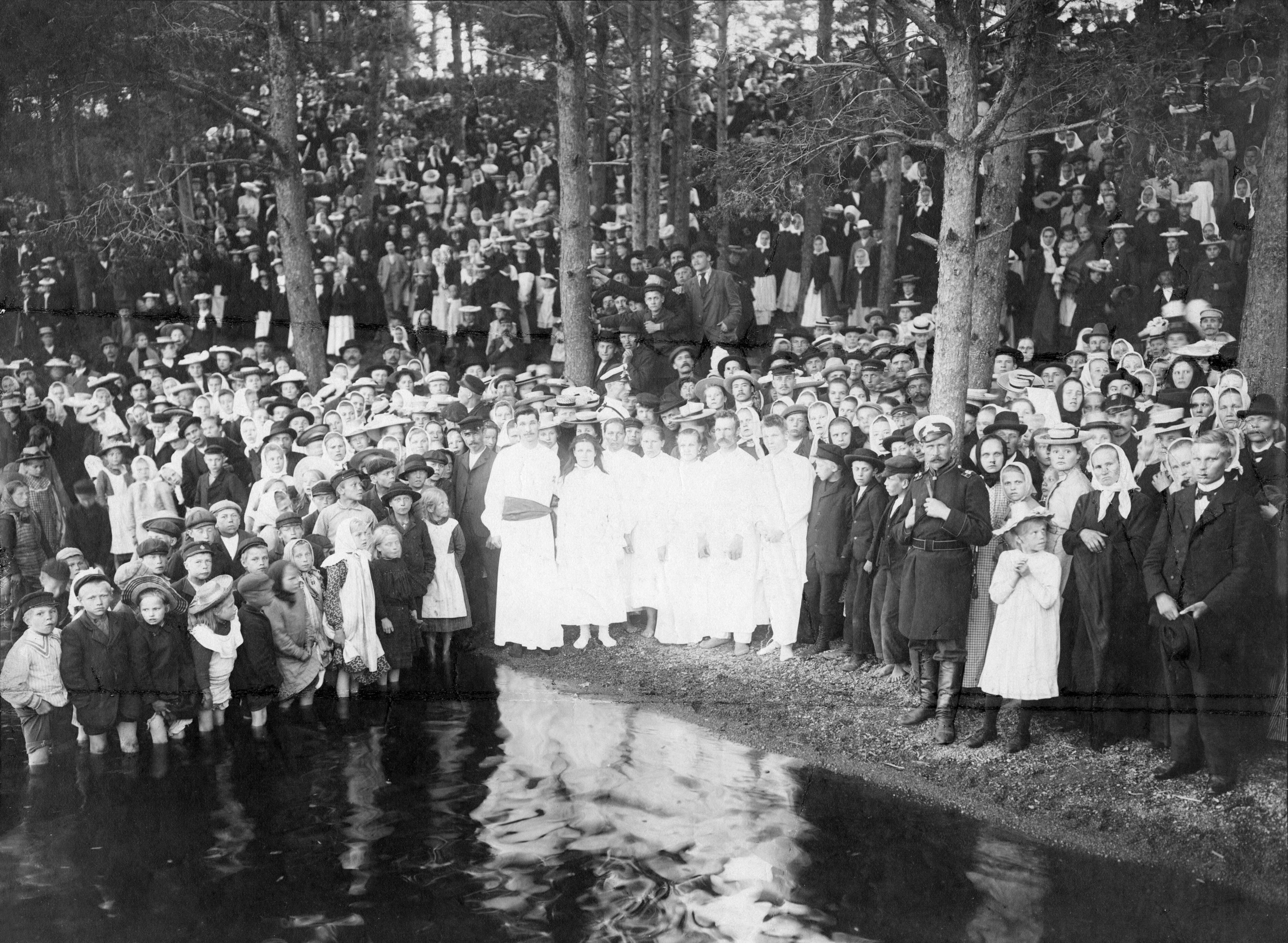
The baptism ceremony in Tampere on September 16, 1886

The Baptist movement did not take long to reach the Finnish-speaking population as well. Some of the people who had been baptized in Ostrobothnia were bilingual and began to preach in Finnish, founding several Finnish-speaking churches. Henrik Nars, from Purmo, was one such preacher. In 1870, a solely Finnish-speaking sailor named Henriksson evangelized in the southwestern Finnish countryside of Satakunta after being converted in England. The Luvia Baptist congregation near Pori (Swedish: Björneborg) traces its origin, also dated 1870, to his work. In 1871, John Hymander, also a Finnish speaker, who had been a priest in the Lutheran church for 40 years, left his position in Parikkala in South Karelia and was baptized by the Baptists in Stockholm. He was known to have had a friendly relationship with the Heikel family. Several in Hymander's family soon followed in baptism and a Baptist church was founded in Parikkala in 1872. More Finnish-speaking Baptist churches were soon founded in Jurva (1879), Turku (1884), Kuopio (1886), Tampere (1890), and Ylistaro (1894). The Finnish Baptist Union was officially formed in 1903.

Reverend Erik Jansson was also a key figure in the church's spread beginning in the 1880s. After joining evangelist Dwight L. Moody's church in Chicago, Jansson returned to Finland and later joined the Baptist church in 1881. He became pastor of the Petalax Baptist Church, which at times had over 400 members and baptized 1000 people. After the Swedish Baptists had exclusively supported the development work in Finland over the first few decades, the Home Mission Society of the American Baptist Churches USA contributed financially starting around 1889.

According to Statistics Finland's demographic statistics, the number of Baptists in Finland was 2,305 at the end of 2024.

=== Baptist origins in Ukraine ===
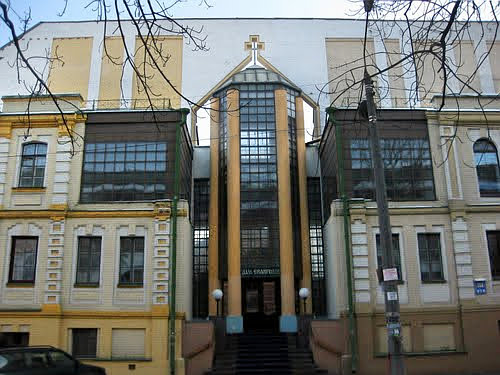
The House of Gospel in Kyiv, the central church of the AUС EСB.

The Baptist churches in Ukraine were preceded by the German Anabaptist and Mennonite communities, who had been living in southern Ukraine since the 16th century, and who practiced adult believer's baptism. The first Baptist baptism (adult baptism by full immersion) in Ukraine took place in 1864 on the river Inhul in the Yelizavetgrad region (now Kropyvnytskyi region), in a German settlement. In 1867, the first Baptist churches were organized in that area. From there, the Baptist tradition spread across the south of Ukraine and then to other regions as well.

One of the first Baptist communities was registered in Kyiv in 1907, and in 1908 the First All-Russian Convention of Baptists was held there, as Ukraine was still controlled by the Russian Empire. The All-Russian Union of Baptists was established in Yekaterinoslav (now Dnipro) in southern Ukraine. At the end of the 19th century, there were between 100,000 and 300,000 Baptists in Ukraine. An independent All-Ukrainian Baptist Union of Ukraine was established during the brief period of Ukraine's independence in early 20th-century and once again after the fall of the Soviet Union, the largest of which is currently known as the Evangelical Baptist Union of Ukraine. Prior to its independence in 1991, Ukraine was home to the second-largest Baptist community in the world, after the United States, and was called the "Bible Belt" of the Soviet Union.

== Baptist churches ==
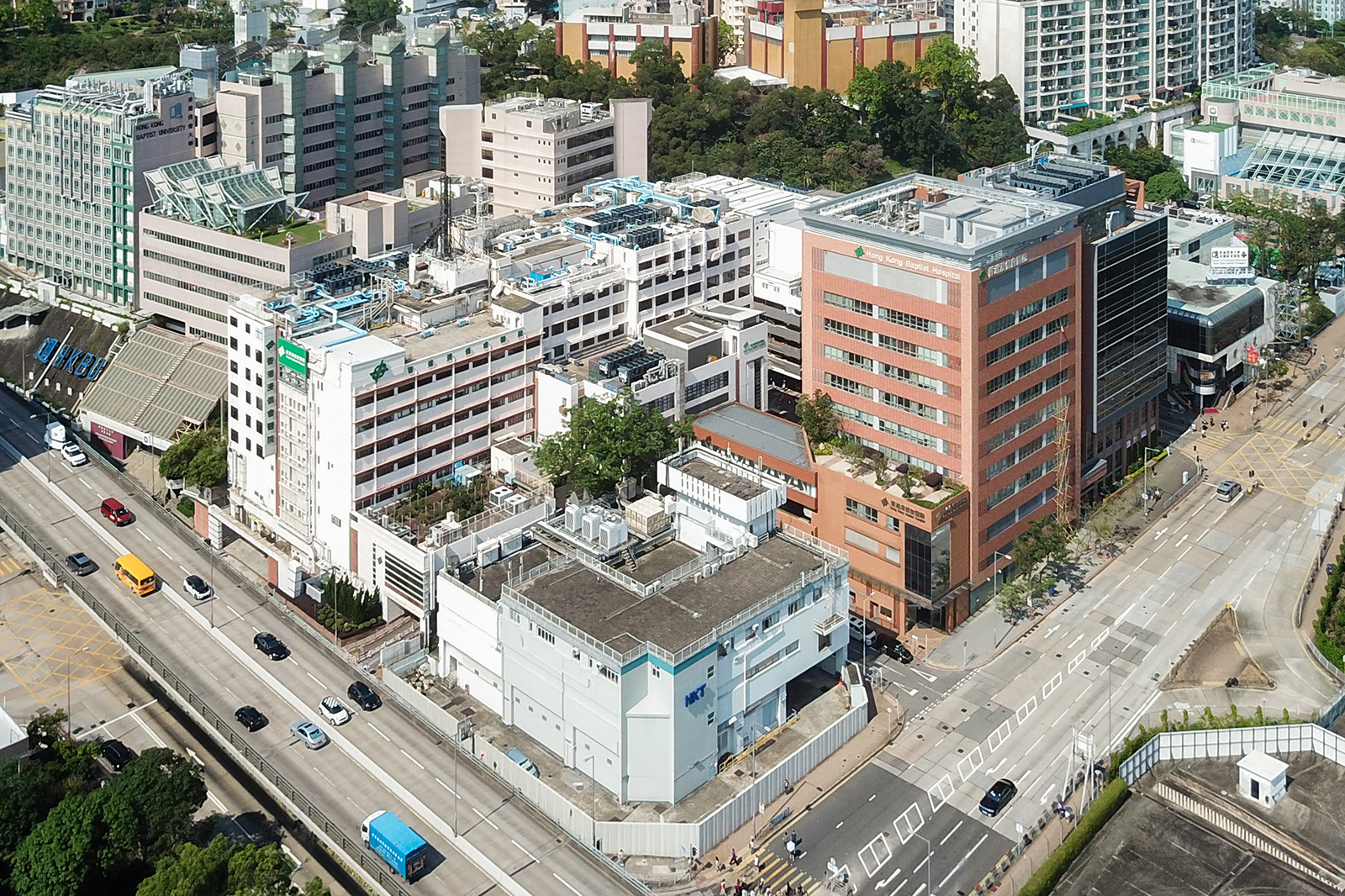
Hong Kong Baptist Hospital, affiliated with the Baptist Convention of Hong Kong.

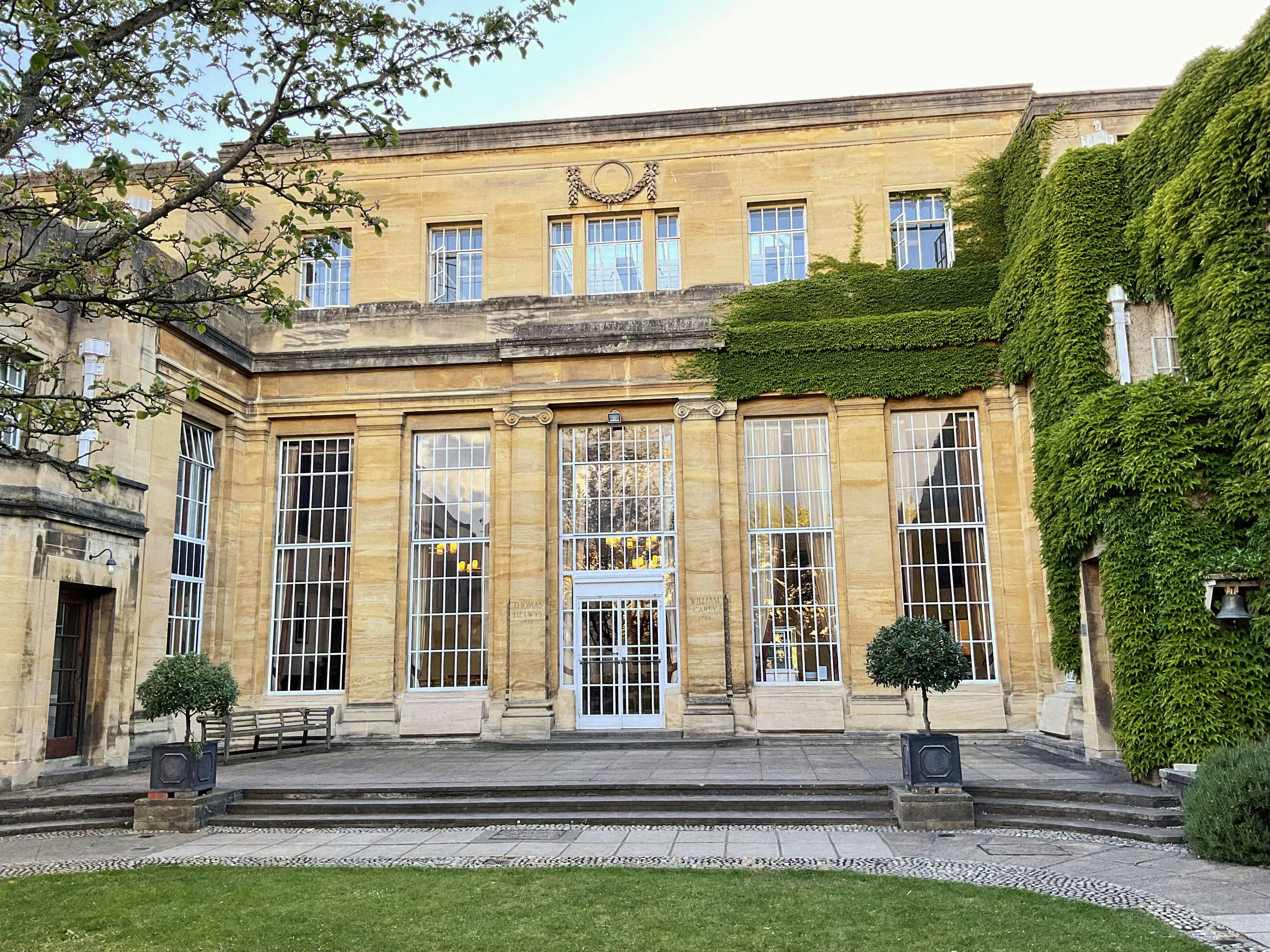
Regent's Park College in Oxford, affiliated with the Baptist Union of Great Britain

Some Baptist church congregations choose to be independent of larger church organizations (Independent Baptist). Other Baptist churches choose to be part of an international or national Baptist Christian denomination or association while still adhering to a congregationalist polity. This cooperative relationship allows the development of common organizations, for mission and societal purposes, such as humanitarian aid, schools, theological institutes and hospitals.

The majority of Baptist churches are part of national denominations (or 'associations' or 'cooperative groups'), as well as the Baptist World Alliance (BWA), formed in 1905 by 24 Baptist denominations from various countries. The BWA's goals include caring for the needy, leading in world evangelism and defending human rights and religious freedom.

== Missionary organizations ==
Missionary organizations favored the development of the movement on all continents. The BMS World Mission was founded in 1792 at Kettering, England. In the United States, International Ministries was founded in 1814, and the International Mission Board was founded in 1845.

== Membership ==
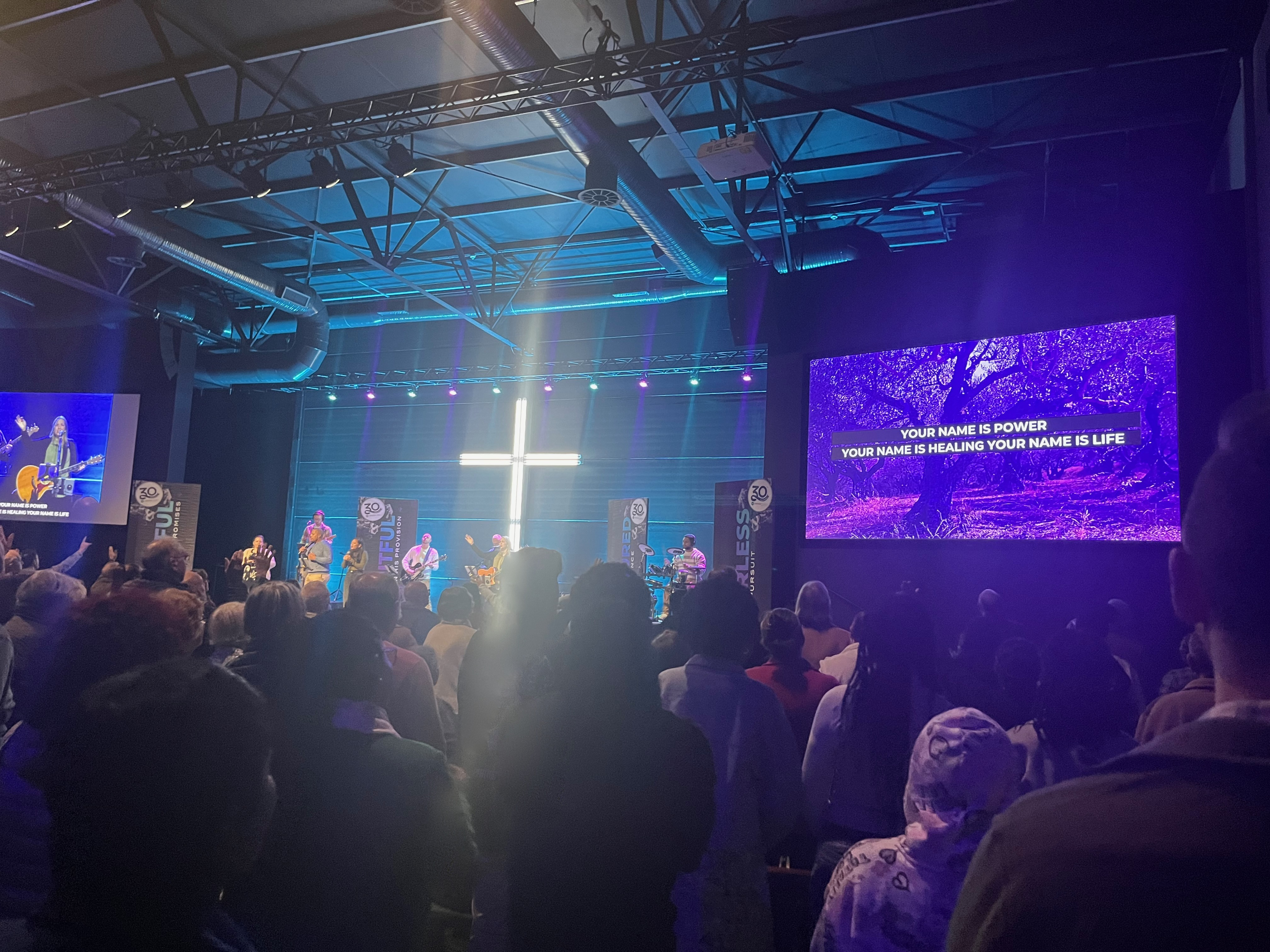
Worship service at Linkway Church in Cape Town, affiliated with the Baptist Union of Southern Africa

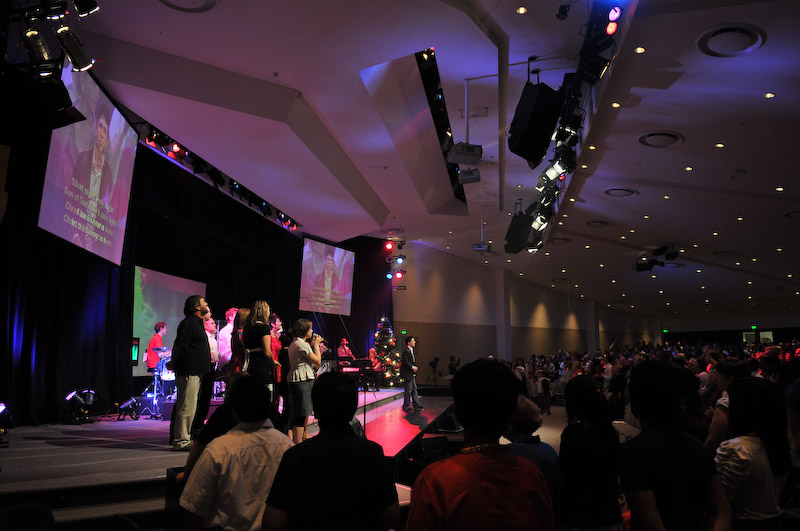
Worship service at Crossway Baptist Church in Melbourne, affiliated with Australian Baptist Ministries, 2008

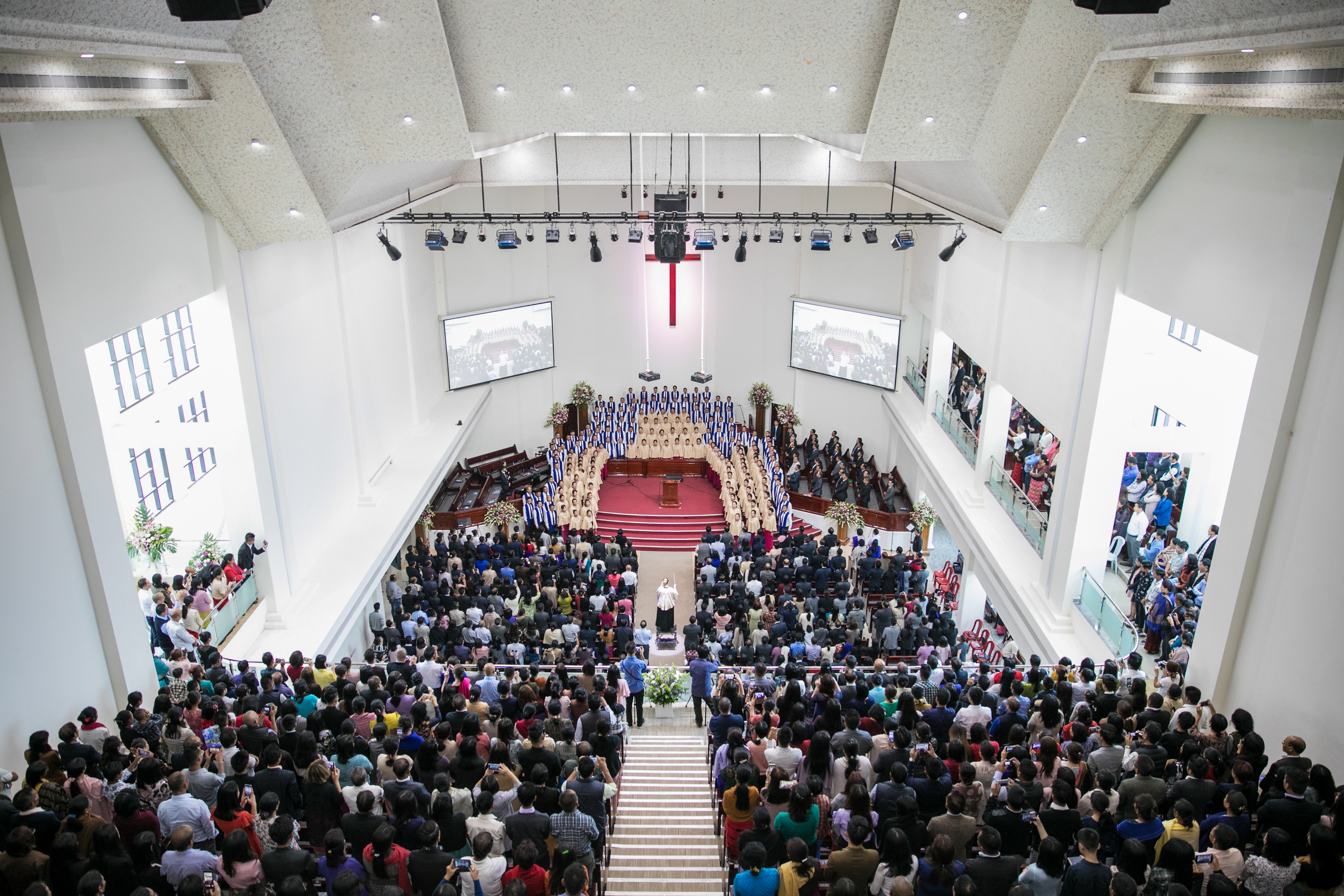
Worship service at Kohima Ao Baptist Church in Kohima, affiliated with the Nagaland Baptist Church Council (India), 2019

Membership policies vary due to the autonomy of churches, but generally an individual becomes a member of a church through a believer's baptism (which is a public profession of faith in Jesus, followed by immersion baptism). Most Baptists do not believe that baptism is a requirement for salvation but rather a public expression of inner repentance and faith. In general, Baptist churches do not have a stated age restriction on membership, but a believer's baptism requires that an individual be able to freely and earnestly profess their faith.

In 2010, an estimated 100 million Christians identified as Baptist or belonging to a Baptist-type church. In 2020, according to the researcher Sébastien Fath of the CNRS, the Baptist movement has around 170 million believers in the world. According to a Baptist World Alliance census released in 2025, the BWA has 283 participating Baptist fellowships in 138 countries, with 178,000 churches and 53,000,000 baptized members. These statistics may not be fully representative, however, since some churches in the United States have dual or triple national Baptist affiliation, causing a church and its members to be counted possibly by more than one Baptist association, if these associations are members of the BWA.

Among the censuses carried out by individual Baptist associations in 2025, those which claimed the most members on each continent were:

Region	Name	Churches	Members
North America	Southern Baptist Convention	46,608	12,331,954
North America	National Baptist Convention, USA	21,145	8,415,100
South America	Brazilian Baptist Convention	9,238	1,814,158
South America	Evangelical Baptist Convention of Argentina	1,216	85,000
Africa	Nigerian Baptist Convention	14,678	9,015,000
Africa	Baptist Convention of Tanzania	1,432	2,692,179
Africa	Baptist Community of the Congo River	2,697	1,769,444
Asia	Myanmar Baptist Convention	5,494	1,723,500
Asia	Nagaland Baptist Church Council	1,724	716,495
Asia	Convention of Philippine Baptist Churches	1,400	700,000
Europe	All-Ukrainian Union of Churches of Evangelical Christian Baptists	2,154	112,000
Europe	Baptist Union of Great Britain	1,822	99,121
Europe	Union of Christian Baptist Churches in Romania	1,223	87,468
Oceania	Baptist Union of Papua New Guinea	500	85,100
Oceania	Australian Baptist Ministries	1,041	79,326

== Beliefs ==
Christianity encompasses various movements of Christian theology, the main ones being conservative fundamentalist or moderate, liberal and progressive.

Since the early days of the Baptist movement, various associations have adopted common confessions of faith as the basis for cooperative work among churches. Each church has a particular confession of faith and a common confession of faith if it is a member of an association of churches. For Reformed Baptists, historically significant Baptist doctrinal documents include the 1689 London Baptist Confession of Faith, the 1742 Philadelphia Baptist Confession, and the 1833 New Hampshire Baptist Confession of Faith. For General Baptists (Freewill Baptists), the Orthodox Creed and the Treatise on the Faith and Practice of the Free Will Baptists are adhered to. Written church covenants which are adopted by some individual Baptist churches, especially Independent Baptist congregations, as a statement of their faith and beliefs.

Baptist theology is a subset of evangelical theology. It is based on believers' Church doctrine. Baptists, like other Christians, are defined by a school of thought—some of it common to all orthodox and evangelical groups, and a portion of it distinctive to Baptists. Through the years, different Baptist groups have issued confessions of faith—without considering them to be creeds—to express their particular doctrinal distinctions in comparison to other Christians as well as in comparison to other Baptists. Baptist denominations are traditionally seen as belonging to two parties, General Baptists who uphold Arminian theology, and Particular Baptists who uphold Reformed theology (Calvinism). During the holiness movement, some General Baptists accepted the teaching of a second work of grace and formed denominations that emphasized this belief, such as the Ohio Valley Association of the Christian Baptist Churches of God and the Holiness Baptist Association. Most Baptists are evangelical in doctrine, but their beliefs may vary due to the congregational governance system that gives autonomy to individual local Baptist churches. Historically, Baptists have played a key role in encouraging religious freedom and the doctrine of separation of church and state.

Shared doctrines would include beliefs about one God; the virgin birth of Jesus; miracles; substitutionary atonement for sins through the death, burial, and bodily resurrection of Jesus; the Trinity; the need for salvation (through belief in Jesus Christ as the Son of God, his death and resurrection); grace; the Kingdom of God; last things (eschatology) (Jesus Christ will return personally and visibly in glory to Earth, the dead will be raised and Christ will judge everyone in righteousness); and evangelism and missions.

Most Baptists hold that no church or ecclesiastical organization has inherent authority over a Baptist church. Churches can properly relate to each other under this polity only through voluntary cooperation, never by any sort of coercion. Furthermore, this Baptist polity calls for freedom from governmental control. Exceptions to this local form of local governance include a few churches that submit to the leadership of a body of elders, as well as the Episcopal Baptists who have an Episcopal system.

Baptists generally believe in the literal Second Coming of Christ. Beliefs among Baptists regarding the "end times" include amillennialism, both dispensational and historic premillennialism, with views such as postmillennialism and preterism receiving some support.

Some additional distinctive Baptist principles held by many Baptists:

- The supremacy of the canonical Scriptures as a norm of faith and practice. For something to become a matter of faith and practice, it is not sufficient for it to be merely consistent with and not contrary to scriptural principles. It must be something explicitly ordained through a command or example in the Bible. For instance, this is why Baptists do not practice infant baptism: they say the Bible neither commands nor exemplifies infant baptism as a Christian practice. More than any other Baptist principle, this one when applied to infant baptism is said to separate Baptists from other evangelical Christians.
- Baptists believe that faith is a matter between God and the individual. It is connected in theory with the advocacy of absolute liberty of conscience.
- Insistence on immersion believer's baptism as the only mode of baptism. Baptists do not believe that baptism is necessary for salvation. Therefore, for Baptists, baptism is an ordinance, not a sacrament, since in their view it imparts no saving grace.

=== Beliefs that vary among Baptists ===
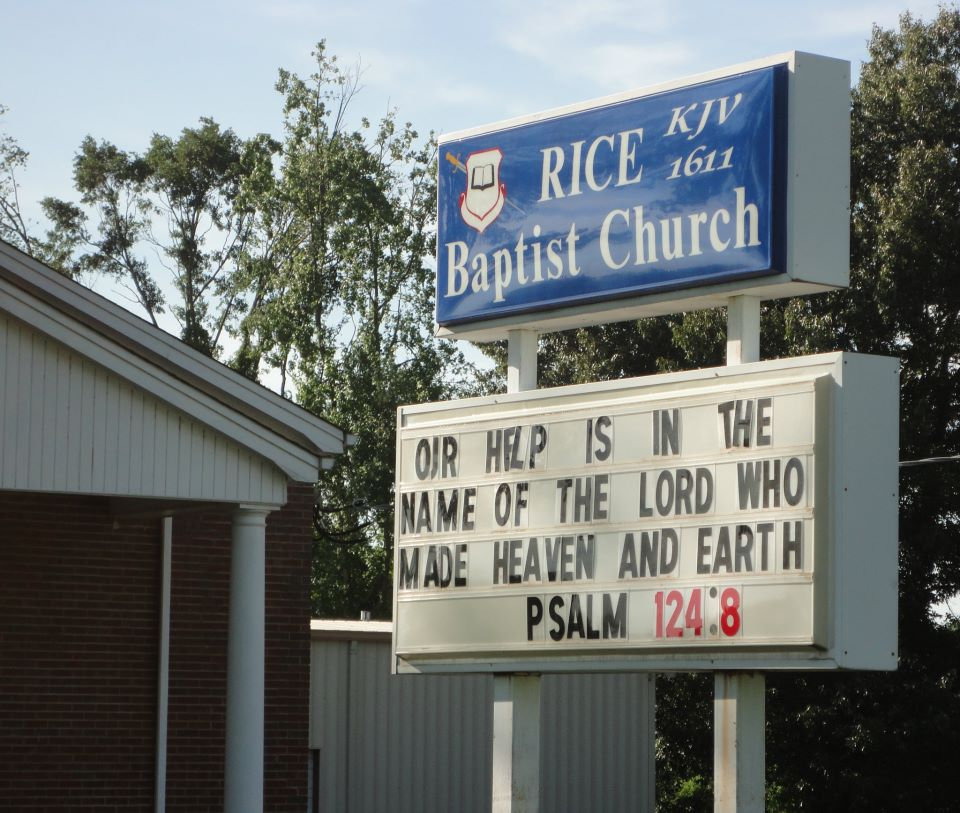
Church sign indicating that the congregation uses the Authorized King James Version of the Bible of 1611

Since there is no hierarchical authority and each Baptist church is autonomous, there is no official set of Baptist theological beliefs. These differences exist among associations and even among churches within the associations. Some doctrinal issues on which there is widespread difference among Baptists are:

- Number of sacraments or ordinances, variously including Baptism, the Lord's Supper, Feetwashing, and Headcovering
- Eschatology
- Arminianism versus Calvinism (General Baptists uphold Arminian theology while Particular Baptists teach Calvinist theology).
- The doctrine of separation from "the world" and whether to associate with those who are "of the world"
- Belief in a second work of grace, i.e. entire sanctification (held by General Baptists in the Holiness tradition)
- Speaking-in-tongues and the operation of other charismatic gifts of the Holy Spirit in the charismatic churches
- How the Bible should be interpreted (hermeneutics)
- The extent to which missionary boards should be used to support missionaries
- The extent to which non-members may participate in the Lord's Supper services
- Which translation of Scripture to use (e.g., King James Only movement)
- Dispensationalism versus Covenant theology
- The role of women in marriage
- The ordination of women as deacons or pastors.
- Attitudes to and involvement in the ecumenical movement.
- The role of repentance and perseverance in salvation (Lordship salvation controversy).
- How to distinguish the persons of the trinity (social trinitarianism and classical trinitarianism).

Excommunication may be used as a last resort by some denominations and churches for members who do not want to repent of beliefs or behavior at odds with the confession of faith of the community. When an entire congregation is excluded, it is often called disfellowship.

=== Marriage ===
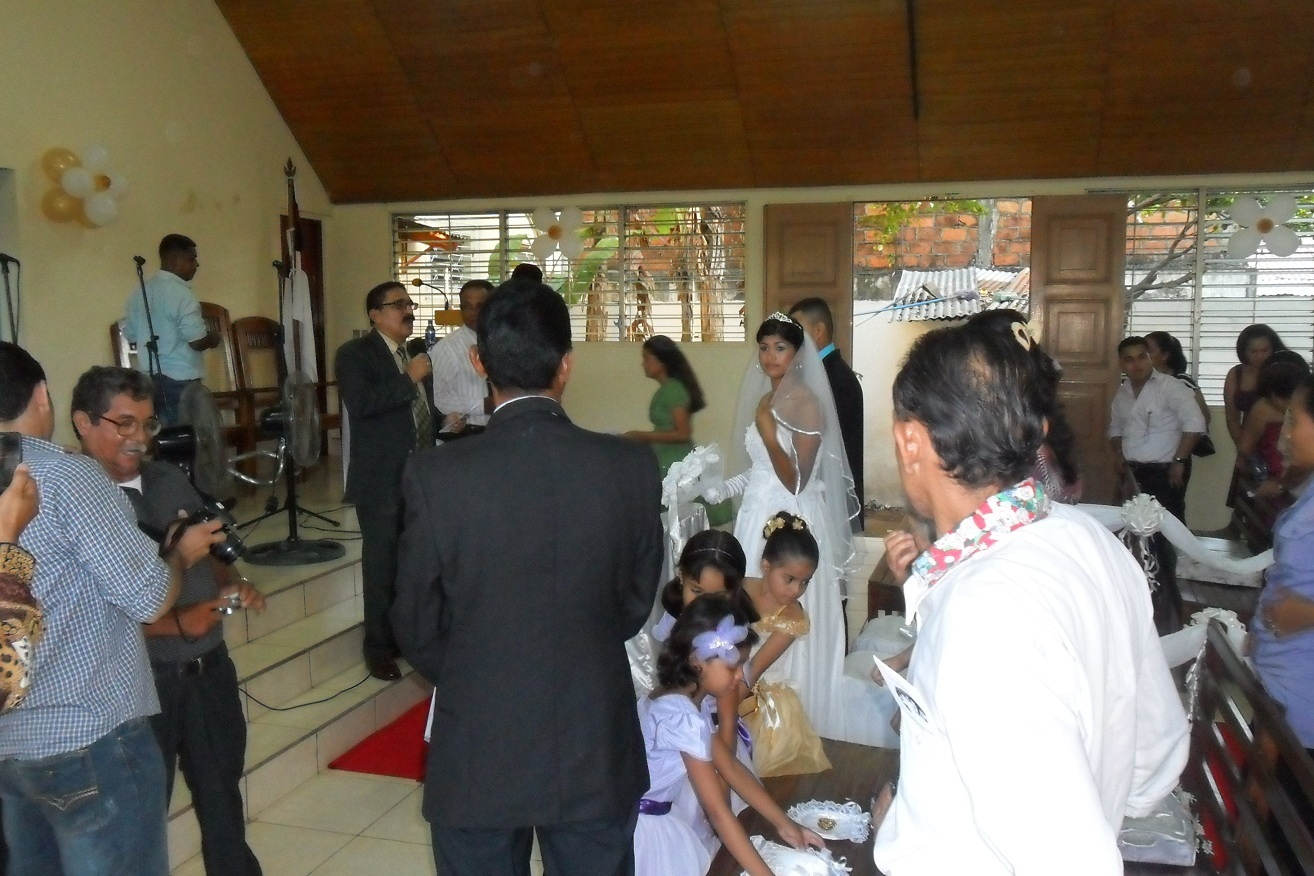
Wedding ceremony at First Baptist Church of Rivas, Baptist Convention of Nicaragua, 2011

Most Baptist associations in the world only support marriage between a man and a woman.

Some Baptist associations allow local churches to decide about blessings of same-sex marriage, such as the Canadian Association for Baptist Freedoms, the American Baptist Churches USA, the Progressive National Baptist Convention (USA), the Cooperative Baptist Fellowship (USA), the National Baptist Convention, USA, the Baptist Union of Great Britain, the Open Baptists Association (Australia)

Some Progressive Baptist associations support blessings of same-sex marriage, such as the Alliance of Baptists (USA), the Baptist Peace Fellowship of North America (USA), the Aliança de Batistas do Brasil, the Fraternidad de Iglesias Bautistas de Cuba, and the Association of Welcoming and Affirming Baptists (international).

=== Sexuality ===
Many churches promote virginity pledges to young Baptist Christians, who are invited to engage in a public ceremony of sexual abstinence until Christian marriage. This pact is often symbolized by a purity ring. Programs like True Love Waits, founded in 1993 by the Southern Baptist Convention, have been developed to support the commitments.

== Types of Baptists ==
=== General Baptists ===
General Baptists are Baptists who hold to the doctrine of general atonement, believing that Jesus Christ's vicarious death was an atonement for all humanity—not only for the elect. The first credobaptists in England and Wales were General Baptists. The General Baptists wished further reformation in the Church of England. They produced the Standard Confession of Faith, in 1660, and the Orthodox Creed, in 1679.

Later, General Baptists became very ecumenical, especially with the Anglican Church, and approached the Classical Arminian soteriology under Thomas Grantham's influence.

Free Will Baptists in the United States are a sub-group within the General Baptist strand.

=== Reformed Baptists (Particular Baptists) ===
The Particular Baptists or Reformed Baptists or Calvinistic Baptists are Baptists who hold to the Calvinistic view of salvation. Depending on the denomination, Calvinistic Baptists adhere to varying degrees of Reformed theology, ranging from simply embracing the Five Points of Calvinism, to accepting a modified form of federalism; all Calvinistic Baptists reject the classical Reformed teaching on infant baptism. While the Reformed Baptist confessions affirm views of the nature of baptism similar to those of the classical Reformed, they reject infants as the proper subjects of baptism.

In distinction to the General Baptists who emphasized separation from the Church of England, many Particular Baptists sought more ecumenism. They produced the 1689 Baptist Confession of Faith.

Primitive Baptists are a type of Calvinist Baptists who adhere to some type of Reformed beliefs, who came out of the controversy among Baptists on the use of mission boards, tract societies and temperance societies. Primitive Baptists reject some elements of classical Reformed theology, such as infant baptism, and avoid the term "Calvinist". They are still Calvinist in the sense of holding strongly to the Five Points of Calvinism and they explicitly reject Arminianism. They are also characterized by "intense conservatism".

=== Missionary Baptists ===
The Missionary Baptists were a group of Baptists that came from the missionary controversy in the United States, where the Missionary Baptists supported the usage of missionaries.

=== Independent Baptists ===
Independent Baptists are Baptists who arose in the early 20th century from local Baptist congregations whose members were concerned about the doctrines of theological liberalism in national Baptist conventions. Independent Baptists are primarily fundamentalist, and although they may differ on multiple issues such as soteriology, dress standards, music, the practice of communion among others, they are homogenous on issues such as opposition to homosexuality, ordination of women, the charismatic movement, evolution and abortion.

==== New Independent Baptists ====
During the 21st century, the New Independent Fundamental Baptist movement was founded out of the Independent Baptist movement by Steven Anderson due to perceived liberalism in Independent Baptist churches. However, this movement has been heavily criticized by Independent Baptists due to many doctrinal differences. Some former New IFB pastors in addition to other Baptists have also charged the association with being a cult.

The New IFB is characterized by radical exclusivism, and it rejects the major historical creeds of Christianity.

=== Seventh Day Baptists ===
Seventh Day Baptists are Baptists who practice seventh-day Sabbatarianism. However, it is not certain when Seventh Day Baptists took denominational form, and they do not claim an unbroken succession of church organization from before the Reformation.

=== Landmark Baptists ===
Landmark Baptists are a Baptist movement which originated in the 19th century in the United States, with leaders such as J. R. Graves, J. M. Pendleton and A. C. Dayton, although they denied being a new movement, but a continuation of the old-fashioned Baptists. Landmark Baptists believe that the term "church" should be reserved for Baptist churches exclusively, arguing that groups such as Methodists or Presbyterians are not churches at all, but only religious societies. They believe that Baptists share an unbroken line of succession from the early church.

== Worship ==
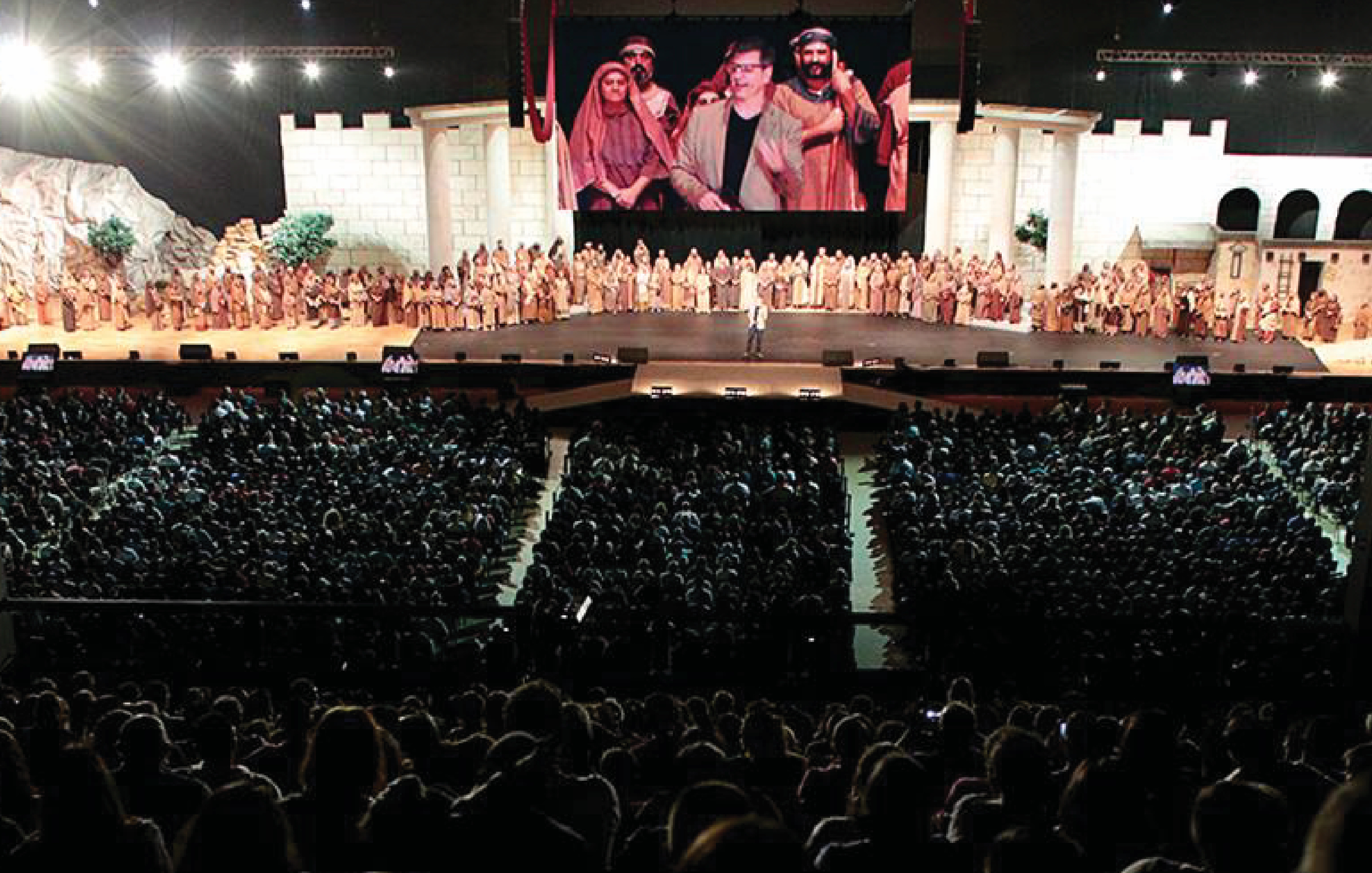
Show on the life of Jesus at City Church in São José dos Campos, affiliated to the Brazilian Baptist Convention, 2017

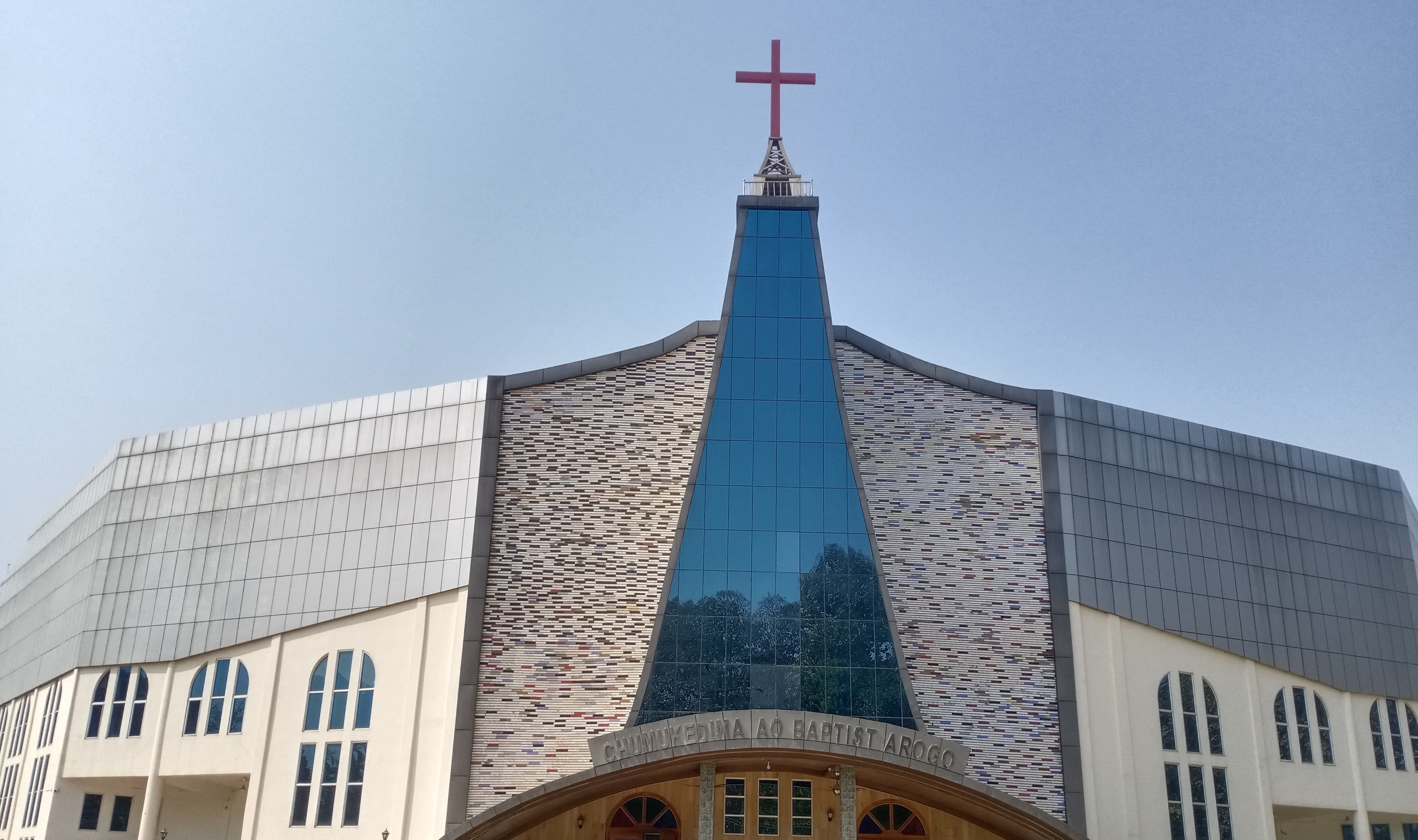
Chümoukedima Ao Baptist Church, affiliated with the Nagaland Baptist Church Council (India)

In Baptist churches, worship service is part of the life of the church and includes praise, worship, of prayers to God, a sermon based on the Bible, offering, and periodically the Lord's Supper. Some churches have services with traditional Christian music, others with contemporary Christian music, and some offer both in separate services. In many churches, there are services adapted for children, even teenagers. Prayer meetings are also held during the week.

The architecture is generally sober, and the Latin cross is one of the only spiritual symbols that can usually be seen on the building of a Baptist church and that identifies the place where it belongs.

== Education ==
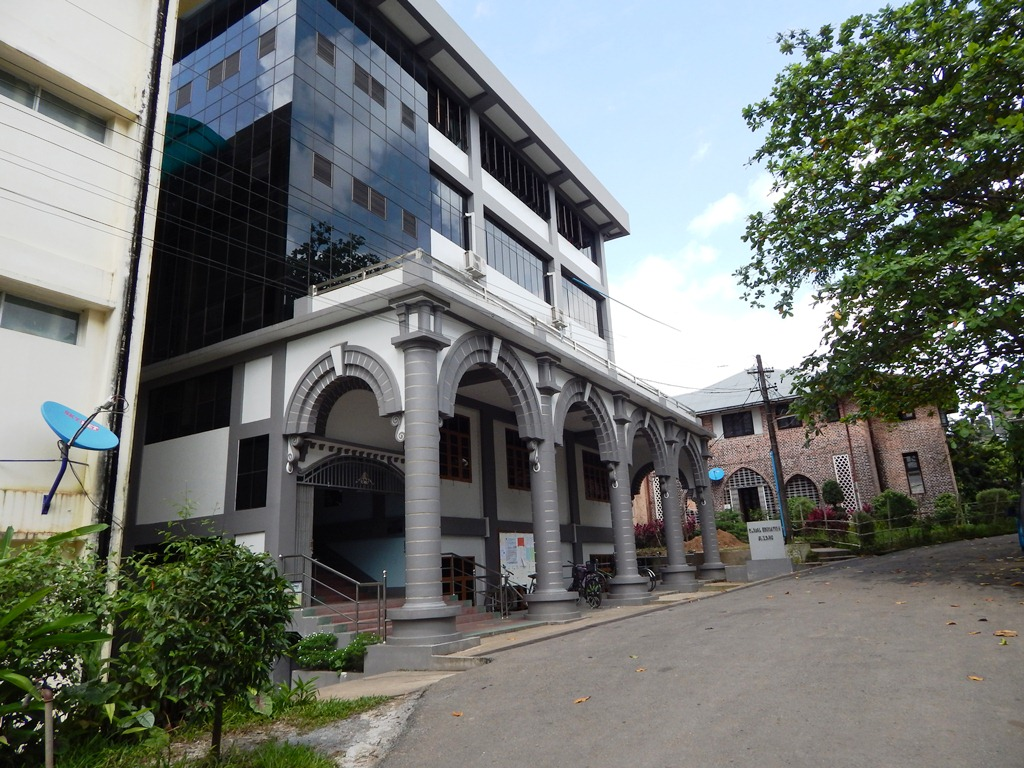
Myanmar Institute of Theology, affiliated with the Myanmar Baptist Convention

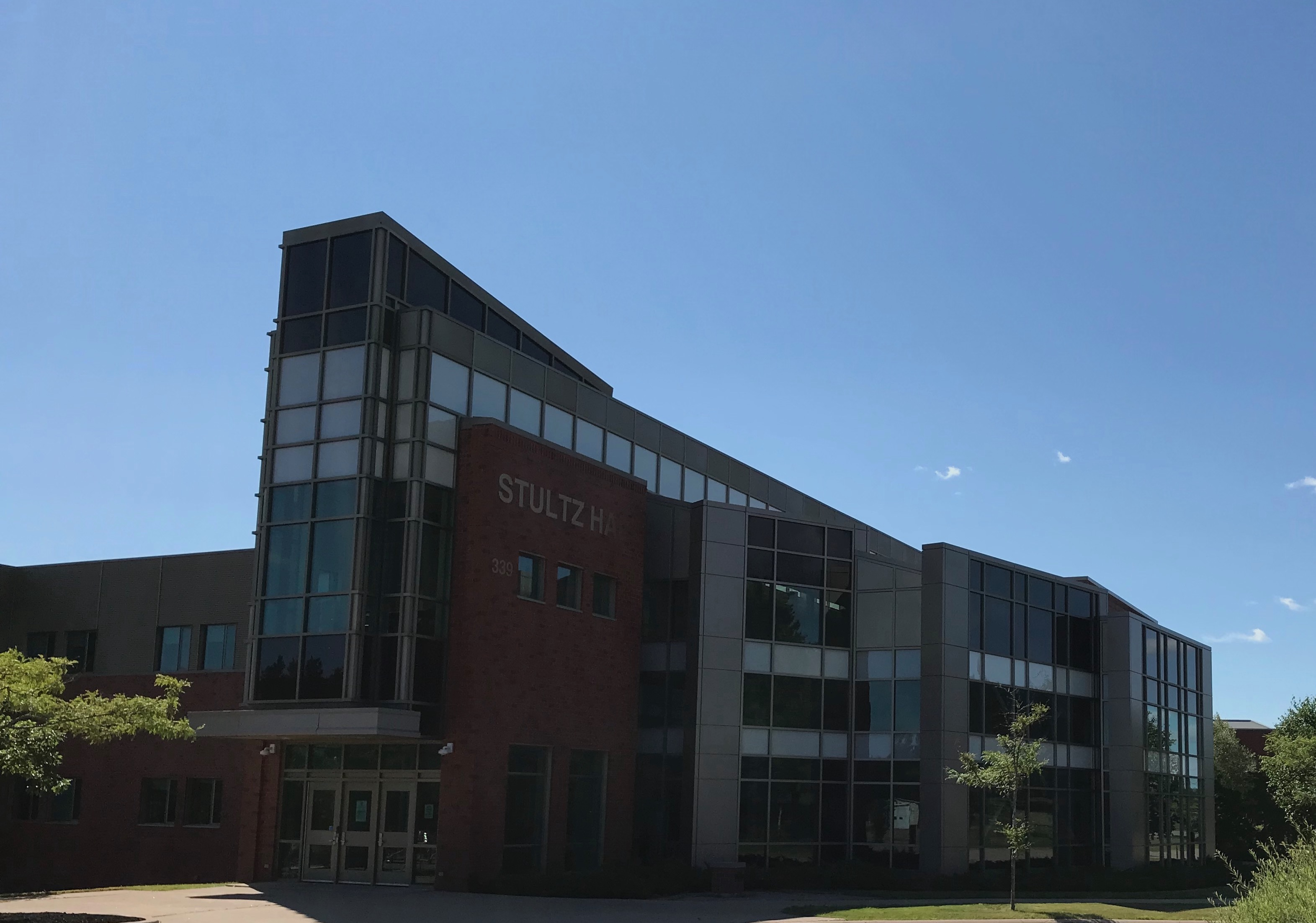
Crandall University in Moncton, affiliated with the Canadian Baptists of Atlantic Canada (Canadian Baptist Ministries)

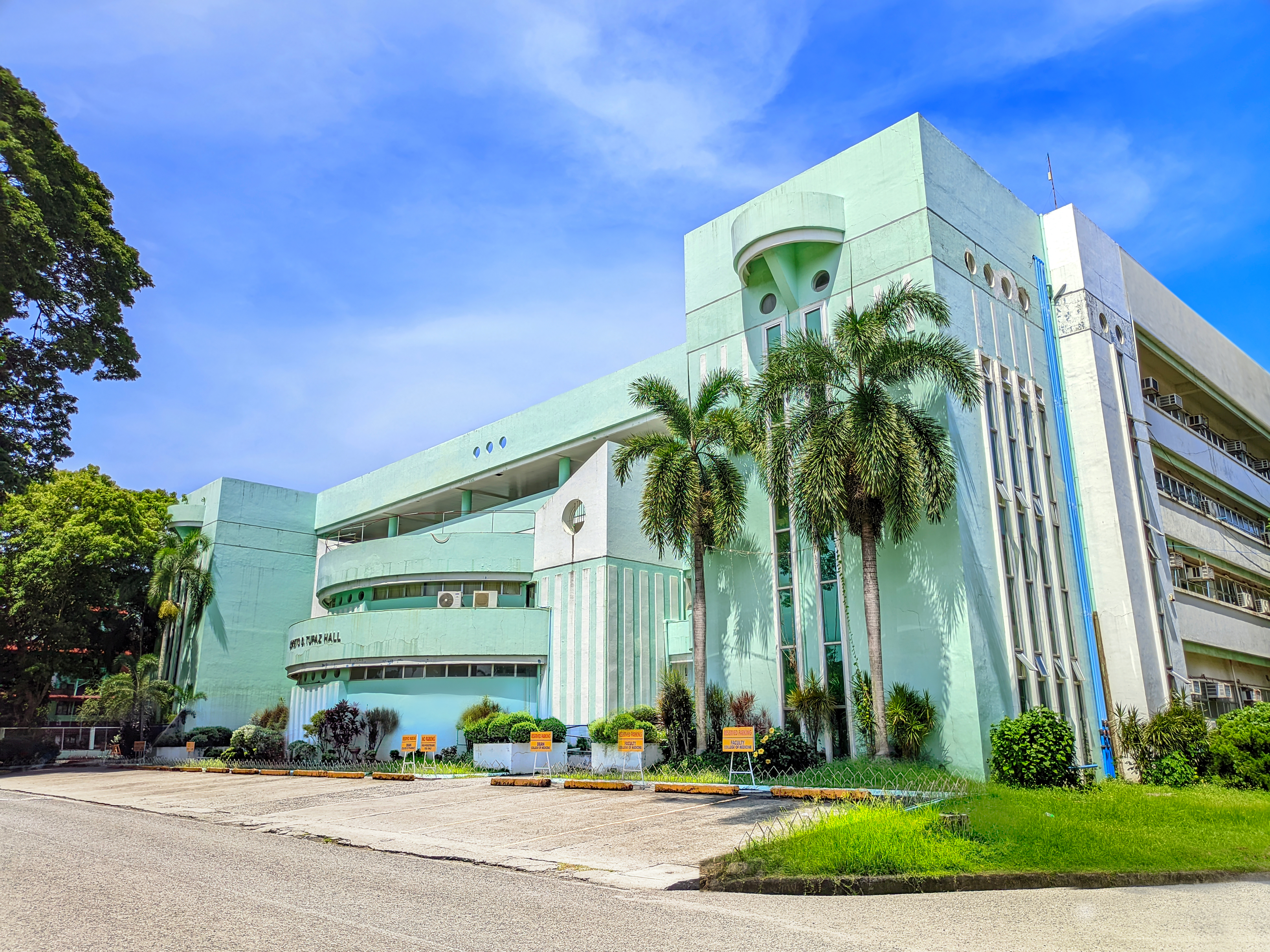
College of Nursing, Central Philippine University in Iloilo City, affiliated with the Convention of Philippine Baptist Churches

Baptist churches established elementary and secondary schools, Bible colleges, colleges and universities as early as the 1680s in England, before continuing in various countries. In 2006, the International Association of Baptist Colleges and Universities was founded in the United States. In 2023, it had 46 member universities and 75,000 students.

== Controversies ==
Baptists have faced many controversies in their 400-year history, controversies of the level of crises. Baptist historian Walter Shurden says the word crisis comes from the Greek word meaning 'to decide.' Shurden writes that contrary to the presumed negative view of crises, some controversies that reach a crisis level may actually be "positive and highly productive." He claims that even schism, though never ideal, has often produced positive results. In his opinion, crises among Baptists each have become decision moments that shape their future.

=== Missions crisis ===
Early in the 19th century, the rise of the modern missions movement, and the backlash against it, led to widespread and bitter controversy among the American Baptists. During this era, the American Baptists were split between missionary and anti-missionary. A substantial secession of Baptists went into the movement led by Alexander Campbell to return to a more fundamental church.

=== Slavery crisis ===
==== United States ====
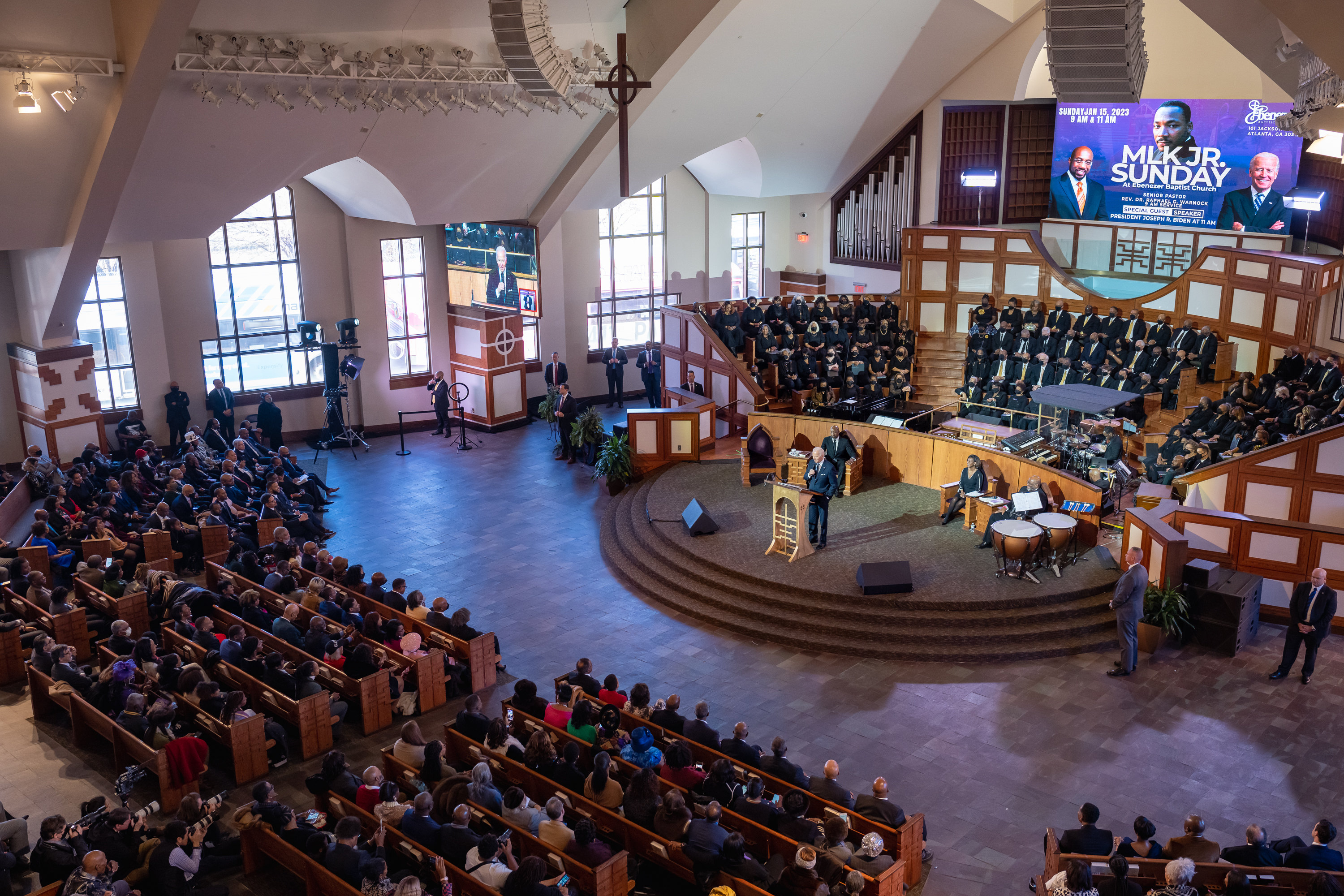
Service at Ebenezer Baptist Church in Atlanta (Georgia), affiliated with the Progressive National Baptist Convention

Leading up to the American Civil War, Baptists became embroiled in the controversy over slavery in the United States. Whereas in the First Great Awakening, Methodist and Baptist preachers had opposed slavery and urged manumission, over the decades they made more of an accommodation with the institution. They worked with slaveholders in the South to urge a paternalistic institution. Both denominations made direct appeals to slaves and free Blacks for conversion. The Baptists particularly allowed them to play active roles in congregations. By the mid-19th century, northern Baptists tended to oppose slavery. As tensions increased, in 1844 the Home Mission Society refused to appoint a slaveholder as a missionary who had been proposed by Georgia. It noted that missionaries could not take servants with them, and also that the board did not want to appear to condone slavery.

In 1845, a group of churches in favor of slavery and in disagreement with the abolitionism of the Triennial Convention (now American Baptist Churches USA) left to form the Southern Baptist Convention. They believed that the Bible sanctions slavery, and that it was acceptable for Christians to own slaves. They believed slavery was a human institution which Baptist teaching could make less harsh. By this time, many planters were part of Baptist congregations, and some of the denomination's prominent preachers, such as Basil Manly Sr., president of the University of Alabama, were also planters who owned slaves.

As early as the late 18th century, Black Baptists began to organize separate churches, associations and mission agencies. Blacks set up some independent Baptist congregations in the South before the Civil War. White Baptist associations maintained some oversight of these churches.

In the postwar years, freedmen quickly left white congregations and associations, setting up their own churches. In 1866, the Consolidated American Baptist Convention, formed from Black Baptists of the South and West, helped southern associations set up Black state conventions, which they did in Alabama, Arkansas, Virginia, North Carolina, and Kentucky. In 1880, Black state conventions united in the national Foreign Mission Convention to support Black Baptist missionary work. Two other national Black conventions were formed, and in 1895 they united as the National Baptist Convention. This organization later went through its own changes, spinning off other conventions. It is the largest Black religious organization and the second-largest Baptist organization in the world. Baptists are numerically the most dominant in the Southeast. In 2007, the Pew Research Center's Religious Landscape Survey found that 45% of all African Americans identify with Baptist denominations, with the vast majority of those being within the historically Black tradition.

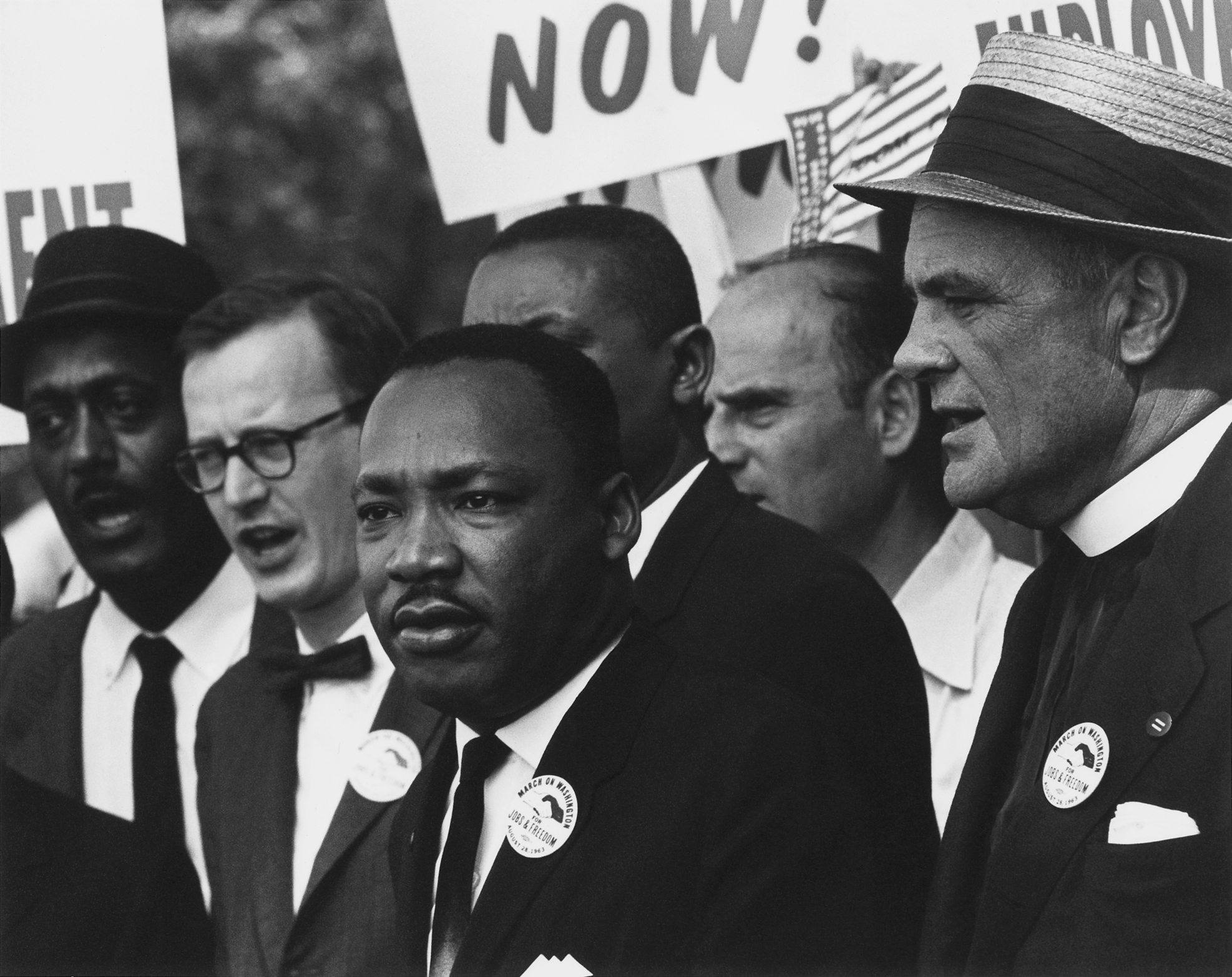
Martin Luther King Jr., a Baptist minister and civil rights leader, at the 1963 civil rights march on Washington, D.C. The Civil Rights movement divided various Baptists in the U.S., as slavery had more than a century earlier.

In the American South, the interpretation of the Civil War, the abolition of slavery and the postwar period has differed sharply by race since those years. Americans have often interpreted great events in religious terms. Historian Wilson Fallin contrasts the interpretation of Civil War and Reconstruction in White versus Black memory by analyzing Baptist sermons documented in Alabama. They quickly organized their own congregations and developed their own regional and state associations and, by the end of the 19th century, a national convention.

White preachers in Alabama after Reconstruction expressed the view that:

God had chastised them and given them a special mission – to maintain orthodoxy, strict biblicism, personal piety, and "traditional" race relations. Slavery, they insisted, had not been sinful. Rather, emancipation was a historical tragedy and the end of Reconstruction was a clear sign of God's favor.

Black preachers interpreted the Civil War, Emancipation and Reconstruction as "God's gift of freedom." They had a gospel of liberation, having long been identified with the Book of Exodus from slavery in the Old Testament. They took opportunities to exercise their independence, to worship in their own way, to affirm their worth and dignity, and to proclaim the fatherhood of God and the brotherhood of man. Most of all, they quickly formed their own churches, associations, and conventions to operate freely without white supervision. These institutions offered self-help and racial uplift, a place to develop and use leadership, and places for the proclamation of the gospel of liberation. As a result, Black preachers said that God would protect and help him and God's people; God would be their rock in a stormy land.

The Southern Baptist Convention supported white supremacy and its results: disenfranchising most Blacks and many poor whites at the turn of the 20th century by raising barriers to voter registration, and passage of racial segregation laws that enforced the system of Jim Crow. Its members largely resisted the civil rights movement in the South, which sought to enforce their constitutional rights for public access and voting; and enforcement of midcentury federal civil rights laws.

In 1995, the Southern Baptist Convention passed a resolution that recognized the failure of their ancestors to protect the civil rights of African Americans. More than 20,000 Southern Baptists registered for the meeting in Atlanta. The resolution declared that messengers, as SBC delegates are called, "unwaveringly denounce racism, in all its forms, as deplorable sin" and "lament and repudiate historic acts of evil such as slavery from which we continue to reap a bitter harvest." It offered an apology to all African Americans for "condoning and/or perpetuating individual and systemic racism in our lifetime" and repentance for "racism of which we have been guilty, whether consciously or unconsciously." Although Southern Baptists have condemned racism in the past, this was the first time the convention, predominantly White since the Reconstruction era, had specifically addressed the issue of slavery.

The statement sought forgiveness "from our African-American brothers and sisters" and pledged to "eradicate racism in all its forms from Southern Baptist life and ministry." In 1995, about 500,000 members of the 15.6-million-member denomination were African Americans and another 300,000 were ethnic minorities. The resolution marked the denomination's first formal acknowledgment that racism played a role in its founding.

==== Caribbean islands ====
A healthy Church kills error, and tears evil in pieces! Not so very long ago our nation tolerated slavery in our colonies. Philanthropists endeavored to destroy slavery, but when was it utterly abolished? It was when Wilberforce roused the Church of God, and when the Church of God addressed herself to the conflict—then she tore the evil thing to pieces! – C.H. Spurgeon an outspoken British Baptist opponent of slavery in 'The Best War Cry' (1883)

Elsewhere in the Americas, in the Caribbean in particular, Baptist missionaries and members took an active role in the anti-slavery movement. In Jamaica, for example, William Knibb, a prominent British Baptist missionary, worked toward the emancipation of slaves in the British West Indies (which took place in full in 1838). Knibb supported the creation of "Free Villages" and sought funding from English Baptists to buy land for freedmen to cultivate; the Free Villages were envisioned as rural communities to be centered around a Baptist church where emancipated slaves could farm their own land. Thomas Burchell, missionary minister in Montego Bay, was active in this movement, gaining funds from Baptists in England to buy land for what became known as Burchell Free Village.

Prior to emancipation, Baptist deacon Samuel Sharpe, who served with Burchell, organized a general strike of slaves seeking better conditions. It developed into a major rebellion of as many as 60,000 slaves, which became known as the Christmas Rebellion or the Baptist War. It was put down by government troops within two weeks. During and after the rebellion, an estimated 200 slaves were killed outright, with more than 300 judicially executed later by prosecution in the courts, sometimes for minor offenses.

Baptists were active after emancipation in promoting the education of former slaves; for example, Jamaica's Calabar High School, named after the port of Calabar in Nigeria, was founded by Baptist missionaries. At the same time, during and after slavery, slaves and free Blacks formed their own Spiritual Baptist movements—breakaway spiritual movements which theology often expressed resistance to oppression.

=== Landmark crisis ===
Southern Baptist Landmarkism sought to reset the ecclesiastical separation which had characterized the old Baptist churches, in an era when inter-denominational union meetings were the order of the day. James Robinson Graves was an influential Baptist of the 19th century and the primary leader of this movement. While some Landmarkers eventually separated from the Southern Baptist Convention, the movement continued to influence the Convention into the 20th and 21st centuries.

=== Modernist crisis ===
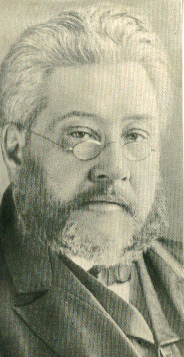
Charles Spurgeon later in life

The rise of theological modernism in the late 19th and early 20th centuries also greatly affected Baptists. The Landmark movement has been described as a reaction among Southern Baptists in the United States against incipient modernism. In England, Charles Spurgeon fought against modernistic views of the Scripture in the Downgrade Controversy and severed his church from the Baptist Union as a result.

The Northern Baptist Convention in the United States had internal conflict over modernism in the early 20th century, ultimately embracing it. Two new conservative associations of congregations that separated from the convention were founded as a result: the General Association of Regular Baptist Churches in 1933 and the Conservative Baptist Association of America in 1947.

Following similar conflicts over modernism, the Southern Baptist Convention adhered to conservative theology as its official position. In the late 20th century, Southern Baptists who disagreed with this direction founded two new groups: the liberal Alliance of Baptists in 1987 and the more moderate Cooperative Baptist Fellowship in 1991. Originally both schisms continued to identify as Southern Baptist, but over time they "became permanent new families of Baptists."

=== Criticism ===
In his 1963 book, Strength to Love, Baptist pastor Martin Luther King Jr. criticized some Baptist churches for their anti-intellectualism, especially because of the lack of theological training among pastors.

In 2018, Baptist theologian Russell D. Moore criticized some Baptists in the United States for their moralism emphasizing strongly the condemnation of certain personal sins, but being silent on the social injustices that afflict entire populations, such as racism. In 2020, the North American Baptist Fellowship, a region of the Baptist World Alliance, officially made a commitment to social justice and spoke out against institutionalized discrimination in the American justice system. In 2022, the Baptist World Alliance adopted a resolution encouraging Baptist churches and associations that have historically contributed to the sin of slavery to engage in restorative justice.

== Sexual abuse ==
Some churches and Baptist organizations have been criticized by victims of rape and domestic violence for their handling of cases of abuse by pastors or members. Failure to report abuses to the police appears to be prevalent in Independent Baptist churches, or affiliated to denominations which attach great importance to the autonomy of the churches. The evangelical organization GRACE was founded in 2004 by the Baptist professor Boz Tchividjian to help churches combat sexual abuses, psychological abuses and physical abuses in Christian organizations. In 2019, widespread sexual abuse cases in Southern Baptist churches were reported by the Houston Chronicle and San Antonio Express-News. The investigation found roughly 380 clergy, lay leaders and volunteers had faced allegations of sexual misconduct, leaving behind over 700 victims since 1998. Meeting in June 2019, SBC delegates approved a resolution condemning sex abuse and establishing a special committee to investigate sex abuse.

== See also ==
- List of Baptist denominations
- List of Baptist World Alliance National Fellowships
- List of Baptists

== Bibliography ==
- Brackney, William H. (1999), Historical Dictionary of the Baptists, Lanham: Scarecrow Press, ISBN 9780810836525, OCLC 1244775694
- Bumstead, JM (1984), Henry Alline, 1748–1784, Hantsport, NS: Lancelot Press.
- Christian, John T (1926), History of the Baptists, vol. 2, Nashville: Broadman Press.
- Crowley, John G (1998). Primitive Baptists of the Wiregrass South: 1815 to the Present. University of Florida Press. ISBN 978-0-8130-1640-5.
- Crowley, John G. (2006). "The Primitive or Old School Baptists". In Jonas, William Glenn (ed.). The Baptist River: Essays on Many Tributaries of a Diverse Tradition. Mercer University Press. ISBN 0-88146-030-3.
- Kidd, Thomas S. and Barry Hankins, Baptists in America: A History (2015)
- Leonard, Bill J (2003), Baptist Ways: A History, Judson Press, ISBN 978-0-8170-1231-1, comprehensive international History.
- Torbet, Robert G (1975) [1950], A History of the Baptists, Valley Forge, PA: Judson Press, ISBN 978-0-8170-0074-5.
- Wright, Stephen (2004), Early English Baptists 1603–1649.
