= Patience (disambiguation) =

Patience is the state of endurance under difficult circumstances.

Patience may also refer to:

== Places ==
- Patience Island, in Rhode Island, United States
- Fort Patience, Dutch-built fort in Ghana
- Gulf of Patience, in Sakhalin Oblast, Russia

== People ==
- Patience (given name), a female given name; includes a list of people with the name
- John Patience (born 1949), British author and illustrator
- Judy Patience (born 1939), New Zealand artist specialising in weaving

== Art, entertainment, and media ==
- Solitaire, a family of single-player card games also known as patience
  - Patience, also called Klondike (US) or Canfield (UK), the most popular of the patience games
  - Patience sorting, a sorting algorithm based on the card game
- "Patience" (poem), a late 14th-century alliterative poem
- Patience (graphic novel), a 2016 science fiction love story by Daniel Clowes
- Patience (play), a 1998 play by Jason Sherman
- Patience (TV series), a 2025 British–Belgian police procedural series
- "Patience" (The X-Files), an episode of the eighth season of the television series The X-Files
- Patience Phillips, the character who becomes Catwoman in the 2004 film Catwoman
- Patience and Fortitude, nicknames of the lion sculptures flanking the entrance to the Schwarzman branch of the New York Public Library

=== Music ===
- Patience (opera), or Bunthorne's Bride, a Gilbert & Sullivan comic opera
- Patience (Peter Hammill album), released in 1983
- Patience (Over the Rhine album), released in 1992
- Patience (George Michael album), released in 2004
- Patience (The Dead C album), released in 2010
- Patience (Mannequin Pussy album), released in 2019
- Frank Iero and the Patience, a band

==== Songs ====
- "Patience" (Guns N' Roses song), 1988
- "Patience" (Take That song), 2006
- "Patience" (Dreamgirls song), from the 2006 film Dreamgirls
- "Patience" (Tame Impala song), 2019
- "Patience" (KSI song), 2021
- "Patience" (Agnez Mo song), 2022
- "Patience" (Jaydes song), 2022
- "Patience", a 2005 song by Dala, from their album This Moment Is a Flash
- "Patience", a 2010 song by Nas and Damian Marley, from their album Distant Relatives
- "Patience", a 2016 song by the Lumineers, from their album Cleopatra
- "Patience", a 2016 song by Shawn Mendes, from his album Illuminate
- "Patience", a song by The Featherz, from their 2017 album Five Year Itch

== Other uses ==
- Kshanti, Buddhist concept of patience as a practice of perfection

== See also ==
- Patient (disambiguation)
