= Patient (disambiguation) =

A patient is any person who receives medical attention, care, or treatment.

Patient may also refer to:

- Patient (grammar), in linguistics, the participant of a situation upon whom an action is carried out

== Publications ==
- Patient (memoir), a book by Ben Watt
- The Patient: Patient-Centered Outcomes Research, a medical journal

== Film and TV ==
- Patient (film), a 2016 American thriller film
- Patients (film), a 2016 French drama film
- "The Patient (Miracles)", an episode of the TV series Miracles
- The Patient, a 2022 American streaming thriller TV series

== Music ==
- Patient, a 1999 album by Bluebottle Kiss

=== Songs ===
- "Patient", a song by Peter Hammill from his 1983 album Patience
- "Patient", a song by Klinik from their 1992 album Contrast
- "Patient", a song by Corpus Delicti from their 1994 album Sylphes
- "The Patient", a song by Fine China from their 2000 album When The World Sings
- "The Patient", a song by Tool from their 2001 album Lateralus
- "Patient", a song by Post Malone from his 2016 album Stoney
- "The Patient", a song by Lala Hsu from her 2017 album The Inner Me
- "Patient", a song by Charlie Puth from his 2018 album Voicenotes

== See also ==
- Patient UK, a health website
- Thomas Patient (died 1666), English Baptist minister
- "Patiently", a song by Journey from their 1978 album Infinity
- "Patiently", a song by 10 Years from Division
- Patience (disambiguation)
- Outpatients (band) - an American rock band
