= Confession of Faith (1644) =

Reformed Baptist confession of faith

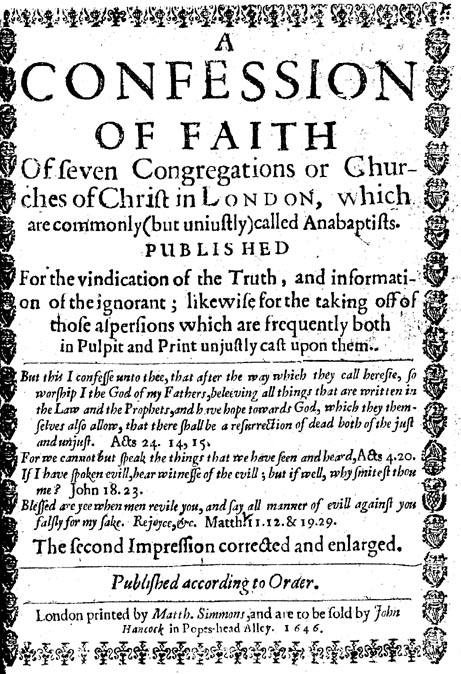
First London Confession of Faith

The Confession of Faith (1644), also called the First London Confession of Faith (1LCF), is a Particular Baptist confession of faith.

== History and Editions ==
The 1LCF—officially called: A Confession of Faith of Seven Congregations or Churches of Christ in London, which are commonly (but unjustly) called Anabaptist—emerged amidst the turbulent political and religious landscape of 17th-century Britain. Between 1642 and 1649, England descended into civil war, pitting Royalist forces against Parliamentarians. This conflict culminated in the execution of Charles I in 1649 and the temporary abolition of the monarchy. During the interregnum, religious structures were redefined. In 1643, the Anglican Church's episcopal hierarchy was suspended, and the Westminster Assembly was convened. Their work produced the Westminster Confession of Faith, a foundational document for many Reformed churches.

Parallel to these events, from the 1630s onward, various Nonconformist churches began operating independently from the state church. Among these were Puritans who adopted credobaptism; they faced both theological opposition, as well as persecution in some quarters. The established clergy responded to Baptist influence with unprecedented published refutations—at least thirteen treatises between 1641 and 1646. The collapse of episcopal authority forced the Anglican clergy to engage seriously with lay theological arguments. Public debates became common, exemplified by a January 1644 debate at Terling, Essex, where Baptist theologians Thomas Lambe and Timothy Batt debated three ministers.

In August 1644, Stephen Marshall warned the Westminster Assembly about dangerous Baptist activity. The Assembly's subsequent report recommended that any ministers teaching against infant baptism be required to submit written explanations and not teach their doctrines further until examined by the authorities. In October 1644, seven London Baptist churches jointly issued the First London Confession of Faith, likely as a direct response to this report. Evidence suggests some of the Congregationalists in the Westminster Assembly may have leaked Assembly information to the Baptists. Their confession of faith sought to clarify and assert their Reformed theology and orthodoxy to make it clear they aren't from the same group as the radical Anabaptists, particularly those associated with the Münster Rebellion.

The First London Confession drew heavily from the 1596 True Confession and notably did not address the Lord's Supper, likely due to doctrinal consensus with their Congregationalists, Presbyterians and Anglican contemporaries on this point.

In response to criticism, a second edition was released in early 1646. This version—co-signed by a French-speaking migrant congregation—clarified various articles, affirmed private property, and revised ecclesial offices to reflect the two-office view of the church (i.e. presbyter and deacon). This 1646 edition is generally regarded as the authoritative text.

Two further editions followed in 1651 and 1652, with the 1651 edition introducing notable yet less substantial changes. The fourth edition (1652) was identical in content to the third, differing only in orthography. Due to a typesetting error, the first edition in 1644 included, after article 52, another paragraph (titled "The Conclusion" in the corrected version of 1646) that was also numbered (in roman numbers) as 52. This has led some to assume that the confession contained 53 articles.

== Doctrine ==
The confession has an emphasis on christology, soteriology and ecclesiology. It contains the doctrine of the regenerate Church and credobaptism.

According to Baptist historian William Lumpkin:

“Essential agreement [between the Second London Confession of Faith and the earlier First London Confession] was claimed in the introductory note [of the Second London Confession], but scarcity of copies and general ignorance of that [first] Confession, as well as the need for more full and distinct expression of views than that Confession offered, were given as reasons for preparing the new Confession. As a matter of fact, there are numerous and marked differences between this Confession and that of 1644. To be sure, certain phrases were taken from the former Confession, and there are evidences that other reminiscences from it were included, but, nevertheless, a number of significant and far-reaching changes were made. Among the innovations were the treatment of such subjects as the Scriptures, the Sabbath, and marriage. Moreover, the views of the church and of the ordinances were altered.”

== Signatories ==
The original 1644 confession was signed by:

- William Kiffin,
- Thomas Patience,
- John Spilsbery,
- George Tipping,
- Samuel Richardson,
- Thomas Shippard,
- Thomas Munday,
- John Mabbatt,
- John Webb,
- Thomas Killcop,
- Paul Hobson,
- Thomas Goare,
- Joseph Phelps, and
- Edward Heath.

== Current usage ==
Reformed Baptist churches have subscribed to the First London Confession of Faith because of reservations to some of the specifics of the Second London Confession and thus could not adopt the latter without exceptions. In 2022, a new Comprehensive Edition of the confession has been published, integrating textual variants from the historical text versions of the London editions. This version is not comprehensive in the sense of including or documenting every variant from each of the original text versions, rather, based on the text of the second edition from 1646, it does include variants from the earlier 1644 and the later 1651/1652 versions in passages where these in the editor's view most fully express biblical truths. In a few select cases, the text has been amended after consulting other sources contemporary to its authors, this has led to the inclusion of an article on the Lord's Supper; these textual decisions are fully documented.
