= Fern Hollow =

Book series by John Patience

Tales from Fern Hollow Animal Stories
- Author: John Patience
- Illustrator: John Patience
- Country: United Kingdom
- Language: English
- Genre: Children's, fantasy novel
- Publisher: Peter Haddock Ltd
- Published: 1980
- Media type: Print (hardback & paperback)

Fern Hollow Animal Stories is a series of over sixteen books written and illustrated by British author John Patience.

== About ==
The series of books revolve around a village populated by animal characters in what appears to be an early 20th century setting. These stories, illustrated in a traditional natural and interesting style, have remained very popular among children and even adults, since they first appeared and there are more than 16 titles in the series.

== Characters ==
(Please note: the list of character names below was added by public participation and not by the author, John Patience. He created forenames for the child characters in Fern Hollow but not for (most of) the adult characters, naming them simply Mr and Mrs, Dr, Parson, etc.. The majority of forenames for the adults below have been created/added by other people.)

- The Acorns - Trevor and Eileen Acorn and their children Jasper, Jiggy and Podger Acorn (squirrels).
- The Bouncers - Doug and Angela Bouncer, Grandpa and Granny Bouncer and their children Patch, Pippa and Toby Bouncer (rabbits).
- The Brambles - Farmer Barnaby and Jacqui Bramble and their children Madge, Tugger and Tuppence Bramble (badgers).
- The Bushys - Dr. Rory and Ruth Bushy and their son Fergus Bushy (squirrels).
- The Chips - Kelvin and Nettie Chips and their two teenage sons Chucky and Flip Chips (beavers).
- The Crackleberrys - Stewart and Miriam Crackleberry and their daughter Poppy Crackleberry (voles).
- The Croakers - Adrian and Iris Croaker and their children Dipper and Lily Croaker (frogs).
- The Dimlys - Parson Derek and Holly Dimly and their daughter Lupin Dimly (moles).
- The Hoppits - Constable Franklin and Lesley Hoppit and their children Clarence, Clarissa and Horace Hoppit (hares).
- The Periwinkles - Ian and Maura Periwinkle and their son Wally Periwinkle (otters).
- The Prickles - Patrick and Paula Prickles and their daughter Polly Prickles (hedgehogs).
- The Rustys - Eric and Helen Rusty and their children Dusty, Redvers and Rufus Rusty (foxes).
- The Thimbles - Issac and Karen Thimble and their children Dilly and Pud Thimble (fieldmice).
- The Tuttleebees - Gavin and Janet Tuttleebee and their children Heather, Monty and Spud Tuttleebee (mice).
- The Twinkles - Oliver and Deirdre Twinkle and their children Dash, Midge, Skipper and Sparky Twinkle (shrews).
- The Willowbanks - Hayden and Eleanor Willowbank and their son Spike Willowbank (hedgehogs).
- Miss Crisp (fox)
- Brock Gruffy (badger)
- Professor Sigmund Swamp (toad)
- Lord Trundle (fox)
- Lady Edwina Trundle (fox)
- Admiral Benjamin Trundle (fox)
- Boris Blink (owl)
- Leapy Lizard (lizard)
- Blodger (rabbit)
- Cook (badger)
- Stripey (badger)
- Jingle (mouse)
- Sigfreid Whirlygill (otter)
- Old Man Heron (heron)
- Snitch and Snatch (weasels)
- Alphonso Duff (rabbit)

== Books ==
- The Seasons in Fern Hollow
- Granny Bouncer's Rescue
- The Tortoise Fair
- Muddles at the Manor
- Sigmund's Birthday Surprise
- Mr Rusty's New House
- The Unscary Scarecrow
- The Brass Band Robbery
- Sports Day
- Brock the Balloonist
- Parson Dimly's Treasure Hunt
- Mrs Merryweather's Letter
- The Floating Restaurant
- Castaways on Heron Island
- The Midsummer Banquet
- The Mysterious Fortune Teller
- Spike and the Cowboy Band

== Solve the Mystery books ==
- Strangers in Town
- The Giant's Footsteps
- The Missing Ring
- The Mystery Voice

== Little books ==
- Baked In a Pie
- Magical Mr. Willowbank
- Monty's Dragon
- Sailing Race
