= Thomas Patient =

English Baptist minister

- Died: 29 July 1666
- Occupation: minister

Thomas Patient, or Thomas Patience, (died 29 July 1666) was an English Baptist minister.

== Biography ==
Patient after apparently holding some benefice as a young man in the English church (pref. to his Doctrine of Baptism), ‘went out with other godly ministers to New England’ between 1630 and 1635. Soon after his migration he began to entertain doubts on the point of baptism, and ‘resorted to many meetings [of the independents] to have good satisfaction of their doctrine and practice before joining with them in communion’ (ib.) He heard one man preach fifteen sermons on the subject, and at the time ‘knew not a single soul who opposed infant baptism.’ But after ‘searching many authors night and day,’ he at length experienced a mystical revelation of light which lasted for three days, and felt that a ‘true repentance was wrought in’ him. A warrant was out at the time to bring him before the general court of New England, and shortly after, when the first New England law was passed against Baptists (13 November 1644), he returned to England. He was at once chosen as colleague or assistant to William Kiffin, pastor of the Baptist church in Devonshire Square, London. He signed the First London Confession of 1644. This was published mainly in answer to the ‘Dippers Dipt,’ &c., London, 1645, of Daniel Featley. The preface to the second edition (1646) also bears Patient's signature, but before the third was published (1651) he had left London. Patient and Kiffin were unwarrantably accused by Thomas Edwards (Gangræna, i. 84) of laying hands on and anointing with oil one Palmer, a woman in Smithfield.

Patient signed the ‘Epistle Dedicatory’ to Daniel King's ‘A Way to Sion,’ London, 1649, and he also subscribed an epistle entitled ‘Heart Bleedings for Professors' Abominations’ (London, 1650), from the Baptist churches in London, directed specially against Ranters and Quakers.

On 8 March 1649 Patient was chosen by Parliament as one of the ‘six able ministers’ who were to be sent ‘to dispense the gospel in the city of Dublin,’ with a salary each of 200l. a year, to be paid from the revenues of Ireland (Commons' Journals, vi. 379). Patient accordingly accompanied the army to Ireland in June or July 1649, and was attached to General Ireton's headquarters. On 15 April 1650 he writes from Kilkenny, shortly after its capitulation (28 March), of the kindness received from Cromwell, and of the success of his ministrations with Ireton's wife and Colonel Henry Cromwell, daughter and son of the Protector (Milton, State Papers, pp. 6, 7). The following year he was with the army at Waterford, and soon afterwards settled in Dublin, where he became pastor of a Baptist church, and chaplain to General John Jones, who had married Cromwell's sister (cf. Jones, Letters, Hist. Soc. of Lancashire and Cheshire, 1860–1, p. 216). He was appointed by Jones, the Deputy-governor, to preach before him and the council in the Protestant cathedral of Christ Church, Dublin, every Sunday (Noble, House of Cromwell, ii. 215). Crosby says he also founded the well-known Baptist church at Clough Keating; but of this there appears no proof.

A letter from Dublin on 5 April 1654 (Thurloe, State Papers, ii. 213) speaks of an ‘Anabaptist’ congregation, ‘of which Mr. Patience is pastor, from whose church those of profitable employment doe decline daily;’ but Patient heads the list of 117 names appended to an ‘Address from the Baptized Christians in Dublin’ professing loyalty and attachment to the Protector, probably on the occasion of his refusing the title of king in 1657 (Brook, Lives of the Puritans, iii. 425). On 8 July 1659 Patient was described as ‘chaplain to the general officers’ (Cal. State Papers, Dom. 1659–60, p. 13). He returned to England about 1660, and not long after went to Bristol as assistant to Henry Hynam (d. 19 April 1679), minister of the first Baptist church in the Pithay or Friars, now in King Street (Fuller, Rise and Progress of Dissent in Bristol, p. 215). During the mayoralty of Sir John Knight at Bristol dissenters were sharply persecuted, and on 4 October 1663 Patient, with Thomas Ewins and Edward Terrill, was sent to prison for preaching. Patient remained prisoner at least three months, and at the next sessions was probably remanded for refusing to pay the fines imposed.

In 1666 Patient returned to his former sphere in London, being set apart on 28 June 1666 as co-pastor with William Kiffin at Devonshire Square Church. Hanserd Knollys and Kiffin performed the office of laying on of hands. The plague was raging all round the meeting-house, and within a month, on 29 July 1666, Patient fell a victim to its ravages. His death, and burial on the succeeding day, are recorded with much solemnity in the church book of 1665. His will (P.C.C. 132 Mico) was proved, on 2 August 1667, by his widow, Sarah Patient, who was the sole legatee.

Patient wrote ‘The Doctrine of Baptism and the Distinction of the Covenants’ (an attack on infant baptism), London, 1654. This was answered in ‘Caleb's Inheritance in Canaan. By E. W. [Edward Warren], a Member of the Army in Ireland,’ London, 1655.
