= John Patience =

English author and illustrator (b. 1949)

- Born: 1949 (age 76–77)
- Occupations: Writer, illustrator
- Writing career
- Notable work: Fern Hollow Animal Stories

John Patience (January 1949) is an English author and illustrator. He is best known for his Fern Hollow series of books for young children.

== Background ==
He is trained in typography and book design and he has been a published author and illustrator of children's books since 1979, with more than 140 published titles to date, selling all around the world.

== John's Tales from Fern Hollow books ==
- The Seasons in Fern Hollow
- Granny Bouncer's Rescue
- The Tortoise Fair
- Muddles at the Manor
- Sigmund's Birthday Surprise
- Mr Rusty's New House
- The Unscary Scarecrow
- The Brass Band Robbery
- Sports Day
- Brock the Balloonist
- Parson Dimly's Treasure Hunt
- Mrs Merryweather's Letter
- The Floating Restaurant
- Castaways on Heron Island
- The Midsummer Banquet
- The Mysterious Fortune Teller
- Spike and the Cowboy Band
