= Judy Patience =

New Zealand weaver

Judith Ann Patience (born 1939) is a New Zealand artist specialising in weaving. Her work is held in the permanent collections of the Christchurch Art Gallery, the National Art Gallery, New Zealand and the Museum of New Zealand Te Papa Tongarewa.

== Biography ==
Patience was born in England, and emigrated to New Zealand as a child. Patience's work was influenced by the German American textile artist Anni Albers, who headed the Bauhaus weaving movement. In 1974, a piece by Patience won the design competition for the entrance foyer installation at the Dowse Art Museum.

In 2017, her work was included in an exhibition at the Dowse Art Museum.
