= Orthodox Creed =

General Baptist creedal document published in 1679

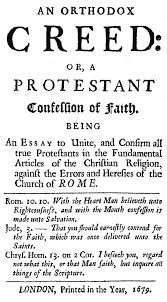
The cover of the Orthodox Creed, published in 1679

The Orthodox Creed, also known as the Orthodox Confession of Faith, shortly the Orthodox Confession, or even as the Buckingham Creed or as the 1679 Baptist Confession of Faith (in modern times), is a General Baptist confession of faith. Drafted up after a Baptist regional assembly held in Buckinghamshire in 1678, the Orthodox Creed was intended to be an official creed of the General Assembly of General Baptists in England; it was adopted by the Buckinghamshire, Hertfordshire, Bedfordshire and Oxfordshire Baptist Associations, and was influential within Baptist churches in England and America.

== Content ==
The Orthodox Confession is organized as an "essay to unite and confirm all true Protestants in the fundamental articles of the Christian religion". The confession includes 50 articles on the Triune God, christology, predestination, covenant theology (teaching Baptist Federalism), free will, justification and santification, Sunday Sabbatarianism, Eucharistic sacramentology, Baptism, Nicene Creed, Athanasian Creed, Apostles Creed, and many other doctrines and practices.
