= John Spilsbury (Baptist minister) =

English Particular Baptist minister (1593 – c. 1668)

John Spilsbury (1593 – c. 1668) was an English cobbler and Particular Baptist minister who set up a Calvinist Baptist church in London in 1638.

== Biography ==
John Spilsbury was born in 1593 in London He was a cobbler at Aldersgate. He was a member of a London Separatist church, which he left in 1633, because of his position on believer's baptism.

== Ministry ==
In 1638, Spilsbury founded the first particular Baptist church in London.

== Scholarly work ==
From Spilsbury's pastoral doctrine, two issues, expansively developed, received forceful treatment: the constitution of a Christian congregation and the "invincible efficacy" of Christ's work for His people.

In 1643, Spilsbury published A Treatise Concerning the Lawfull Subject of Baptisme, which he reissued in a second edition in 1652, "Corrected and enlarged by the Author."

In 1646 he issued God's Ordinance, The Saints Privilege, with a discussion of what he perceived as the two Scripturally-based sacraments of the Christian church. Benjamin Coxe transcribed and enlarged the second part of this work.

== Believer's baptism ==
Spilsbury's presentation of believer's baptism by immersion of necessity engaged covenantal theology. He approved covenant theology and built his doctrine of the church on the "infallible certainty" of the eternal covenant of grace; he argued, however, that the spirituality of the New Covenant in Christ eliminated the possibility of an infant's participation in it.

The issue of the salvation of infants dying in infancy he treated as an area of mystery. He argued that one's answer to that question does not affect the revealed qualifications for those who may legitimately receive New Covenant ordinances. Though the visible perpetuity of the Old Covenant included the circumcision of male infants, the exclusion of infants from the sign of the new does not mean that the new is less encouraging in its privileges than the old.

Spilsbury said that all participation in the positive provisions of the old covenant was only a shadow of the spiritual reality of the new. An infant's exclusion from the positive ordinance of baptism forbids to him, or her, no spiritual blessing. The new covenant assumes the effectual working of the Spirit to create a believing community justified by faith in Christ and employs new positive ordinances as the symbols of its character.

He firmly believed that Believer's baptism, not infant baptism, corresponds to the nature of the new covenant, stands alone as enjoined by the Lord's authority, and alone is practised by the apostles.

Somewhat controversially, Spilsbury asserted that any other baptism is not baptism at all but a faulty cornerstone that would "bring down the church." He said that Protestants, therefore, who retained infant baptism kept themselves "in the company of Antichrist." They must return to Rome or go forward to what he saw as "the true constitution of the church."

== New Testament church ==
Spilsbury's first work, The Lawfull Subject of Baptisme, also dealt at length with the particular task of fitting and preparing the matter, that is how sinners are made fit for constituting a church.

In the final analysis, Spilsbury saw four elements that merged in the creation of a "New Testament church".

First, he argued, must come the Word of God "which is to fit and prepare the matter for the form." The preaching of the Word assaults the pride of man, smooths his "hard and rough turbulent" spirit, aligns his "crooked and Serpent-like nature," and brings him humbly to embrace the "low and mean condition of Christ upon His cross."

Second, Spilsbury said that this same Word so convinces the sinner of its truth that its leaven "seasons and sweetens the whole man." The Word operates like a "fire that breaks forth and discovers itself" with such clarity in "such as have it," that they delineate specific truths from that Word. A confession of faith consisting of particular doctrines naturally develops. Others so prepared "come to one and the same mind and judgement in it."

Spilsbury said that this leads to the third "constituting cause" of a church. The believers so fitted by the Word now covenant to be a body of believers joined by "free and mutual consent and agreement upon the practice of that truth so by God revealed, and by faith received." This voluntary covenant precedes the ordinances.

He said that the fourth cause follows, the Spirit's work in knitting and uniting their hearts together in truth. A corporate witness to propositional truths provides the only clear evidence that such a work of the Spirit has, in fact, occurred.

He wrote:

Their practical subjection to Christ in the said truth, by them received and agreed upon as aforesaid, and this is the Covenant that forms the Church, which ever goes in order before the external administration of any other ordinance than the matters agreement together for orderly practice; for persons must be informed of the truth in judgment, and bound by the same in conscience, and agree upon the practice, before the same can orderly be put into execution.

Spilsbury believed that once such agreement in conversion and truth was ascertained and the "matter," converted and convinced persons so constituted has covenanted with fully informed consciences to be the people of God, the covenant is sealed with baptism. "Thus being in Covenant with God by faith in Jesus Christ, in which their state consists, and so the agreement made, and the covenant passed between them, now the seal is set to. Which is the outward ordinance of Baptism, to confirm the same," he wrote.

== Professions of faith ==
The point must be made clearly and without equivocation that the earliest Particular Baptists, as well as General Baptists, established their churches by agreement to a confession of faith.

Spilsbury considered this as necessary, not just convenient and for the well-being of the church, but for the being of the church. Spilsbury declared in no uncertain terms that saving faith must be manifest in the hearty approval and assertion of a body of propositional truths. No church, and thus no baptism, could exist apart from submission to orthodox evangelicalism embodied in a confession of faith.

Spilsbury said that submission to such constituted the covenantal agreement was necessary before baptism into his doctrine of the church. He further argued that this union must first exist before communion in any other privileges may be enjoyed for the "comfort and well being" of the body.

He summarises the content of a true "Confession of Christ" in part one of Gods Ordinance, the Saints Privilege. The confession of Christ, including all the biblical truths about him, must be culminated in baptism.

He wrote:

The confession that Christ requires of men so believing, is to confesse him in his Name and Titles that his Father hath honoured him with, and set him out by, viz. To be a sufficient and onely Saviour, and the Mediatour of the new Testament; as King, Priest, and Prophet. A Priest to redeeme and purchase his people; a Prophet to teach and instruct that people; and a King to protect and defend the said people in their obedience to the truth, revealed by him as a Prophet, and by him as a King commanded to be obeyed; And as this is to be knowne and believed of such as expect life by him: even so it is to be confessed, by a professed subjection to him in the same. The Rule of which professed subjection and confession, is the instituted order and administration of Christ's Testament; for no other confession doth he approve of but that which holds him forth to be Jesus Christ, the Sonne of God, come in the flesh, dead, and risen againe, ascended, and exalted at Gods right hand, to the throne of his Father David; and so to be Lord of Lord, and King of Kings. And submission to the instituted order and administration of Christ's Testament, is an ordained confession of this believing in him, in a professed subjection to him. This confession doth Christ therefore require of such as believe in him, and ownes no believing unto salvation in his new Testament, once confirmed by his death, where this is refused….If there be no baptising into Christ, then is there not confession of Christ, according to his appointment, then no faith to salvation by Christ, expresly owned.

A truly orthodox confession, arising from true faith, would, according to Spilsbury, certainly culminate in true baptism. Refusal to submit to this ordinance meant the absence of true profession and true faith, "expresly owned."

== Influence on modern Baptists ==
Thus, Spilsbury might be excluding from salvation anyone who does not go on to believer's baptism. Alternatively, however, the meaning of "expresly owned" is that, apart from volitional submission to the established ordinance, the public confession whereby one says, "I have faith in Christ alone as Savior" is absent.

Spilsbury's arguments for the rightness of believer's baptism found virtually no detractors from within Baptist ranks; it continues to influence both Baptist belief and practice today. His arguments that believer's baptism as a necessity for the public owning of Christ became common doctrine.

On the other hand, if one applies the statement rigorously, that apart from believer's baptism there is no saving faith, few if any followers can be found in subsequent Baptist history. Perhaps this ambiguity gave rise to article XVI of the appendix to the 1646 edition of the London confession written by Mr. Spilsbury's friend and co-laborer, Benjamin Cockes (Cox):

Although a true believer, whether baptized, or unbaptized, be in the state of salvation, and shall certainly be saved: Yet in obedience to the command of Christ every believer ought to desire baptism, and to yield himself to be baptized according to the rule of Christ in His word: And where this obedience is in faith performed, there Christ makes this His ordinance a means of unspeakable benefit to the believing soul, Acts 2:38, 22:16; Rom. 6:3, 4; 1 Pet.3:21. And a true believer that here sees the command of Christ lying upon him, cannot allow himself in disobedience thereunto, Acts 24:16.

== Personal confession of faith ==
Spilsbury submitted a personal confession of ten articles for the "Godly reader to judge, what difference there is between him and me, in the main, that men should be so incensed against me, as to seek my life, as some have done."

Spilsbury wanted to disarm those who cast "reproachful clamors ... upon all without exception, that seem to be of my judgment about baptism" by declaring "a word of my faith, what I believe and hold to be truth, and desire to practice the same."

One year later, Spilsbury would join with the other Particular Baptist churches in London in publishing and signing the First London Confession:

- I do believe that there is only one God, who is distinguished in 3 persons; God the Father, God the Son, and God the Holy Ghost; yet but one in nature, or essence, without divisions, and incommunicable, who made the world, and all things therein, by the word of his power, & governs them by his wise providence.
- I believe that God made man in his own Image, an upright and perfect creature, consisting of soul and body: which body God framed of the earth, and breathed into the same the breath of life, and man became a living soul. To whom God gave a law, upon his keeping of which depends all his happiness, and upon the contrary attended his misery, which took effect; for he breaking that law, he fell under the curse, and wrath of God lay upon him and all his posterity. By which fall man lost the knowledge of God, and utterly disabled himself of all ability ever to recover the same again.
- I believe God out of the counsel of his will, did, before he made the world, elect and choose some certain number of his foreseen fallen creatures, and appointed them to eternal life in his Son, for the glory of his grace: which number so elected shall be saved, come to glory, & the rest left in sin to glorify his justice.
- I believe that God in the fullness of his own time, did send his son, the 2d. person, who in the womb of the virgin Mary, assumed mans nature, and in the same he suffered death upon the cross, only as he was man, to satisfy his Fathers justice, for the sins of his elect, & that he lay 3 days and 3 nights in his grave, from whence he arose the third day by the power of his Godhead, for the justification of all for whose sins he died, and that in the same body Christ died, he arose from the death, and afterwards ascended into heaven, the place of glory, where he was before, and there to remain until he comes at the last day to judge the world in righteousness.
- I believe that God of his grace, in his own time, effectually calls such as shall be saved to the knowledge of the truth, who is said, of his own will to beget us by the word of truth: in which work of grace, nature is as passive, as a child in the parents begetting of it; and so God by His Spirit works faith in the hearts of all such to believe in Christ, and his righteousness, only for justification. And thus they are made righteous before God in Christ, and so conformable to the will of God the Father through the Son; and also made holy through the work of regeneration, and the holy Spirit of grace dwelling in them; yet all such have still, as long as they live here in the flesh, remaining in them, an old man, that original corruption, the flesh that wars against the spirit, which hinders them in their obedience both to God and to man, and many times draws them to that which is evil, and contrary to their intentions; yet all of them shall through Christ overcome, and safely be brought to glory at last.
- I believe the holy Scriptures to be the word of God, and have the only authority to bind the conscience to the obedience of all therein contained, and are the all sufficient rule, by the Spirit of God to guide a man in all his obedience both to God and man.
- As for the absence of original sin, and power in the will to receive and refuse grace and salvation being generally offered by the Gospel, and Christ dying for all persons universally, to take away sin that stood between them and salvation, and so laid down his life for a ransom for all without exception, and for such as have been one in God's love, so as approved of by him in Christ for salvation, and in the Covenant of Grace, and for such to fall so as to be damned eternally, and all of the like nature, I do believe is a doctrine from beneath, and not from above, and the teachers of it from Satan, and not from God, and to be rejected as such that oppose Christ and his Gospel.
- I do believe the resurrection of the dead, that all shall rise and come to judgment, and every one give account of himself to God, and receive according to the things done in their bodies, whether they be good or bad; therefore no conscience ought to be forced in the matters of Religion, because no man can bear out another in his account to God, if in case he should cause him to sin.
- I do believe the powers that are, as the civil Magistrates, and so, are of God, to whom God hath committed the Sword of justice, for the punishing of evil doers, and for the good of such as do well, in which respect they ought to be honoured, obeyed, and assisted by all men, and of Christians especially, and that out of conscience to God, whose ordinance and ministers they are, and bear not the sword in vain, Rom. 13, I Pet. 2, Tit. 3.
- And lastly, I do believe that there is an holy and blessed communion of Saints, that God of his grace calls such as belong to life by election, unto the fellowship of his Son by the Gospel, of which matter, God by his word and Spirit joins them together in his Covenant of grace, and so constitutes his Church, as I have before showed: And as God hath thus built for himself an holy habitation of such pure matter, and also after so holy a manner, even so hath he provided a way of preservation and safety for the same; as Isa. 26:1.
- We have a strong City, salvation will God appoint for walls and bulwarks: which City is said to have a wall both great and high, and built upon twelve foundations; great, that none shall break through, and high, that none shall overtop or get over, and strong in the foundation, that nothing shall shake it, and God hath said, that he will be a wall of fire round about, and the glory in the midst of it, and that he will keep it, and watch over it by night and by day, that nothing shall hurt it; and as God hath built himself a house after his own mind, and is a guard to the same; even so he is also said to beautify the same with salvation, and to make the place of his feet glorious, and that he will lay all her stones with fair colours, and her foundations with Sapphires, and her windows of Agars, and her gates of Carbuncles, and all her boarders of pleasant stones, and all her children taught of the Lord, and great shall be the peace of her children.
- And as Christ does thus signify unto us the nature of his church both in respect of her matter, her form, her grace, and comely order in him her head; even so he holds forth his love to her, and delight in her, by these and the like expressions of comfort and solace. The Lord hath chosen Zion, &c. Pas. 132.13,14; Eph. 2:21,23. Pas. 87.2,3; Gal. 4:26,31. Isa. 2.2; Isa. 62. 1,12, Ezek. 48:35. Rev. 21. 12,14, Zech. 2.5, Isa. 26.3, Isa. 4. 11,12,13. Rev. 21. 11,18,21, Cant. 4.7, Psal. 45.13.

== See also ==
- Baptists
- Southern Baptist Convention
- Believer's baptism
- Baptist ordinances
- Baptist offices
