= Petalax =

Petalax Petalax – Petolahti
- Town, former municipality
- Petalax kommun Petolahden kunta
- Coat of arms

- The location of Petalax, Finland
- Interactive map of Petalax
- Coordinates: 62°50′20″N 21°25′23″E
- Country: Finland
- Region: Ostrobothnia
- Sub-region: Vaasa sub-region
- Established: 1926
- Consolidated: 1973

Area
  - Total: 117.5 km^{2} (45.4 sq mi)

Population
  - Total: 1,200 (approx.)
  - Density: 10/km^{2} (26/sq mi)
- Time zone: UTC+2 (EET)
  - Summer (DST): UTC+3 (EEST)
- Postal code: 66240

Petalax (Finnish: Petolahti) is a former municipality in Ostrobothnia. The municipality was incorporated in Malax municipality in 1973. Approximately 1,200 people live in Petalax and the main language is Swedish.
