= Treatise on the Faith and Practice of the Free Will Baptists =

The Treatise on the Faith and Practice of the Free Will Baptists is a document that outlines the basic doctrines, faith and practices of Free Will Baptists. The treatise was adopted in 1935 in Nashville, Tennessee.

On November 5, 1935, the two largest groups of Free Will Baptists, the Cooperative General Association and the General Conference of Free Will Baptists merged together to form the National Association of Free Will Baptists.

Under the treatise, church government takes place at the congregational level. Local congregations voluntarily join local, state and national associations in order to facilitate missions, association colleges, new church planning and other activities.

The treatise is not binding on the member congregations. The Treatise describes the common beliefs and practices that bind the churches and most churches are expected to adopt the Treatise as a "Church Covenant."

The treatise was revised and republished in 1848.
