= List of Reformed Baptists =

This is a partial list of notable Reformed Baptists. Reformed Baptists are Baptists that hold to a Calvinist soteriology and Baptist covenant theology (they will also usually hold to a confession of faith, such as the First or Second London Baptist Confession).

== 17th Century ==
- John Bunyan (1628–1688): English preacher and author of The Pilgrim's Progress
- Hercules Collins (ca. 1646–1702): English Pastor, author of An Orthodox Catechism, and signer of the 1689 London Baptist Confession
- Benjamin Coxe: English Pastor and theologian, signer of the First London Baptist Confession, father of Nehemiah Coxe
- Nehemiah Coxe (1650-1689): English Pastor and signer of the 1689 London Baptist Confession, son of Benjamin Coxe
- Anne Dutton (1692–1765): English poet and associate of John Wesley and George Whitefield
- Benjamin Keach (1640–1704): English theologian, pastor of Metropolitan Tabernacle, writer of Keach's Catechism, signer of the 1689 London Baptist Confession
- Roger Williams (1603–1683): American minister and founder of Rhode Island. Williams later left the Reformed Baptists
- Hanserd Knollys (1599–1691): English Particular Baptist and signatory of the 1644 First London Baptist Confession and 1689 Second London Baptist Confession of Faith
- William Kiffin (1616–1701): English Particular Baptist and signatory of the 1644 First London Baptist Confession and 1689 Second London Baptist Confession of Faith

Other early Particular Baptists include: Henry Jessey, John Spilsbury, William Collins, John Tombes

== 18th Century ==
- William Carey (1761–1834): English missionary
- William Gadsby (1773–1844): an early leader of the Strict and Particular Baptist movement in England.
- Andrew Fuller (1754–1815): founder of the Baptist Missionary Society
- John Gill (1697–1771): English theologian and pastor of Metropolitan Tabernacle
- Adoniram Judson (1788–1850): first Protestant missionary sent from North America to preach in Burma

Other notable Reformed Baptists in this period include: Basil Manly Sr, Elias Keach, John Rippon, John Ryland, Joseph Swain

== 19th Century ==
- Charles Spurgeon (1834–1892): English author and pastor of Metropolitan Tabernacle
- John L. Dagg (1794–1884): Author of the Manual of Theology, the first Baptist systematic theology in America
- James P. Boyce (1827–1888): Founder of the Southern Baptist Theological Seminary
- William Knibb (1803–1845): Missionary to Jamaica known for abolitionism
- Taylor I. Record (1846-1912): State legislator from Indiana, Regular Baptist

Other notable Reformed Baptists in this period include Robert Hall, Robert Haldane, James Haldane, Alexander Maclaren, Krishna Pal, Benajah Harvey Carroll, Basil Manly Jr

== 20th Century ==
- Arthur W Pink (1886–1952): Little known in his own lifetime despite pastoring on both sides of the Atlantic, Pink is one of the most influential evangelical and Reformed authors in the twentieth century due to his magazine Studies in the Scriptures, which have been the source of many influential books e.g. The Sovereignty of God, The Attributes of God, Gleanings in Genesis.
- Ernest Reisinger (1919-2004): An American Reformed Baptist pastor who played a key part in recovery of Calvinism in the Southern Baptist Convention. His influence led to the establishment of Founders Ministries.
- Geoff Thomas (b. 1938): Minister of Alfred Place Baptist Church in Aberystwyth, Wales, from 1965 for 50 years.
- Walter Chantry (1938–2022): Pastor of Grace Baptist Church in Carlisle, Pennsylvania for 39 years. He also edited the Banner of Truth Magazine for 7 years.
- Albert N Martin (b. 1934): Pastor of Trinity Baptist Church Montville, New Jersey for 46 years and taught Pastoral Theology at Trinity Ministerial Academy for 20 years.
- Erroll Hulse (1931–2017): Pastor of Cuckfield Baptist Church in West Sussex, later of Leeds Reformed Baptist Church. He edited Reformation Today magazine from 1970 to 2013 and was the founder of the annual Carey Conference.

== 21st Century ==
- Thomas Ascol (b. 1957): American author, Pastor of Grace Baptist Church in Cape Coral, FL, President of Founders Ministries
- Voddie Baucham (1969–2025): American theologian, Pastor of Grace Family Baptist Church in Spring, TX, Professor at African Christian University in Lusaka, Zambia. Lived in Zambia from 2015 – 2024.
- Alistair Begg (b. 1952): Scottish-American pastor and author, host of the Truth for Life radio program.
- D. A. Carson (b. 1946): Canadian-American theologian and New Testament scholar.
- Matt Chandler (b. 1974): American pastor and President of the Acts 29 Network
- Mark Dever (b. 1960): American Reformed Baptist, Pastor of Capital Hill Baptist Church, and founder of 9Marks Ministry
- Peter Masters (b. 1940): British author and Pastor of the Metropolitan Tabernacle, London, UK.
- Albert Mohler (b. 1959): American theologian and president of the Southern Baptist Theological Seminary.
- John Piper (b. 1946): American preacher and author.
- David Platt (b. 1979): American pastor and former President of the International Mission Board.
- James White (b. 1962): American Apologist, Author, and Pastor at Apologia Church.
- Josh Buice (b. 1977): Former American pastor, founder and former president of G3 Ministries.
