= List of Reformed Baptist denominations =

Reformed Baptist churches, also known as Calvinistic Baptist churches, are united in their adherence to historical Baptist Confessions of Faith that belong to the Reformed tradition, such as the 1689 Baptist Confession of Faith, or the earlier 1644 Baptist Confession of Faith, or the more recent 1966 Strict Baptist Affirmation of Faith. These churches are congregational in their polity, and adhere to both the Five Solae of the Protestant Reformation and the Five Points of Calvinism. Though many simply refer to themselves as Reformed Baptists, the Calvinistic Baptist tradition has subsets, such as Primitive Baptists, Grace Baptists, as well as Strict and Particular Baptists.

Reformed Baptist churches may associate with, be affiliated with, or cooperate/partner with various organizations (associations, fellowships, networks, etc.) of Reformed Baptists churches. The organizations may either be global or organized according to specific regional areas.

== Global organizations and church networks ==
Reformed Baptist organizations and church networks that are global in their membership of churches include:

- G3 Church Network
- Gospel Standard Strict Baptists
- Primitive Baptists
- Reformed Baptist Network

== Africa ==
- Sola 5 (Churches in Botswana, Eswatini, Malawi, Mozambique, Namibia, South Africa, Zambia, and Zimbabwe)

== Brazil ==
- Comunhao Reformada Batista do Brasil

== Ecuador ==
- Asociación de Iglesias Bautistas Reformadas del Ecuador

== India ==
- Reformed Baptist Fellowship of India

== Italy ==
- Evangelical Reformed Baptist Churches in Italy

== Malaysia ==
- Reformed Baptist Churches Malaysia

== North America ==
- Association of Reformed Baptist Churches of Quebec (AERBQ)
- Association of Reformed Baptist Churches of Western Canada (ARBCWC)
- Central Atlantic Reformed Baptist Association (CARBA)
- Central Florida Association of Reformed Baptists (CFARB)
- Confessional Baptist Association (formerly the Association of Reformed Baptist Churches of America)
- Fellowship of Independent Reformed Evangelicals
- Confessional Baptists of the Southwest (CBS)
- G3 Church Network (a North America-based organization with global membership, largely consisting of North America-based churches)
- Gospel Standard Strict Baptists
- Grace Reformed Network
- Louisiana Association of Reformed Baptist Churches (LARBC)
- Mid-America Reformed Baptist Association of Churches
- Primitive Baptist Church
- Reformed Baptist Association of the Midwest (RBAM)
- Reformed Baptist Network (a global organization, though headquartered and meets in North America)
- Rocky Mountain Reformed Baptist Association of Churches (RMRBAC)
- Southeastern Association of Confessional Baptists
- Southern California Association of Reformed Baptist Churches
- Sovereign Grace Churches
- Sovereign Grace Fellowship of Canada
- Texas Area Association of Reformed Baptist Churches

== Australia and New Zealand ==
- Gospel Standard Strict Baptists
- Fellowship of Reformed Baptist Churches in New Zealand

== United Kingdom ==
- Association of Confessional Baptist Churches in the United Kingdom
- Association of Grace Baptist Churches (South East)
- Gospel Standard Strict Baptists
