= Grace Baptist =

Baptist denomination

Grace Baptist is a name used by various churches and associations, in different parts of the world, who would align with Reformed Baptists, holding to Calvinistic doctrine. This distinguishes them from General Baptists who instead hold to an Arminian theology.

== History ==
=== United Kingdom ===
Grace Baptist churches in the UK have mainly derived from the Strict Baptists or Strict and Particular Baptists. The Strict Baptist Assembly, established in 1964, held to beliefs outlined in the Baptist Affirmation of Faith 1966. The Assembly of Baptist Churches was established in 1976 and held to the Calvinistic doctrine of sovereign grace. Through discussions between the Strict Baptist Assembly and the Assembly of Baptist Churches came a conviction and desire to establish a single assembly which in 1980 gave rise to the joint Grace Baptist Assembly.

Alongside the establishment of the Assemblies was the establishment of Associations of Strict Baptist Churches, of which there were three. These have now merged into one Grace Baptist Association, as listed below.

=== United States and Canada ===
Some churches in the U.S. and Canada adopt association with Grace Baptists in the United Kingdom. They do not share the historical developments which led to Sovereign Grace Baptists.

== Associations ==
United Kingdom

In 2025 the Association of Grace Baptist Churches (South East) was renamed Grace Baptist Association (Official website). This includes the following historical Associations:

- Association of Grace Baptist Churches (South East)
- Association of Grace Baptist Churches (West Anglia) - closed in 2024 to join AGBC(SE)
- Association of Grace Baptist Churches (East Anglia) - closed in 2025 to join AGBC(SE)/Grace Baptist Association

== Churches ==
Notable churches which are members of Grace Baptist associations, or are known as Grace Baptist, include:

United Kingdom

- Kew Baptist Church, Kew, Richmond, London
- Homerton Baptist Church, Homerton, Hackney, London

United States

- Grace Baptist Church (Spokane, Washington), which is on the U.S. National Register of Historic Places
- Willis Presbyterian Church and Cemetery, which is on the U.S. National Register of Historic Places
- Grace Baptist Church of Philadelphia

== Schools ==
Notable schools named "Grace Baptist" include:

United States

- Grace Baptist Christian School (Tifton, Georgia)
- Grace Baptist School (Portland, Maine)

== See also ==
- Sovereign Grace Baptists
- Calvinism
- 1689 Baptist Confession of Faith
- History of the Calvinist–Arminian debate
- List of Strict Baptist churches
