= Continental Baptist Churches =

Defunct Christian denomination (1972–2003)

Continental Baptist Churches was an association of "Calvinistic" Baptist churches holding New Covenant theology, organized in June 1983. The roots of this movement are in the Baptist Reformation Review, founded by Norbert Ward at Nashville, Tennessee, in 1972, and the Sword and the Trowel, edited by Ron McKinney of Dallas, Texas. Both of these papers espoused the doctrines traditionally known as Calvinism.

In 1979, the Sword and Trowel leaders began to sponsor an annual "Council on Baptist Theology." Through this form of exchange, it became clear that this "Dallas" group held different understandings, especially in the area of Covenant Theology, from those espoused by northeastern Reformed Baptists led by Walter Chantry and Albert N. Martin. This led the "Dallas" ("Sword and Trowel") churches to form their own association – Continental Baptist Churches. This group began with about twenty churches.

Beliefs held by the churches of this body include the doctrines of grace, often referred to as the Five Points of Calvinism, the gathered believers church, believers' baptism by immersion requisite to church membership and to participation at the Lord's table, and the autonomy of each local church. Continental Baptist Churches accept the First London Confession of Faith (1646 edition) as a general expression of their beliefs.

Continental Baptist churches generally disagreed with other Baptists in the Reformed tradition concerning the function of the moral law and the Ten Commandments in the Christian age, maintaining, for instance, the seventh-day Sabbath position that Christians have no obligation to observe the first day of the week as Christian Sabbath because of the fourth commandment.

The organizational structure includes an executive committee composed of a Council elected by the churches and the officers (Chairman, Vice Chairman, Secretary and Treasurer) elected by the association. A periodical called Kindred Minds is the official publication of Continental Baptist Churches. The association holds a Bible Conference and business meeting each year. In 1995, nine churches were participating in the association. Membership is open to any Baptist church "on the North American continent which subscribes to the Constitution and Articles of Faith of the Association." These churches must be received by majority vote of the messengers at the annual meeting. Continental Baptist Churches also cooperates with the Sovereign Grace Baptist Association of Churches.

Beginning with twenty churches in 1983, by 1994 this body was down to six churches in Indiana, Michigan, New York, Pennsylvania and Virginia. According to Albert Wardin, "ceased as an association in 2003."

== See also ==
- List of Reformed Baptist denominations

== Sources ==
- Continental Baptist Churches: A Fellowship of Kindred Minds, Executive Committee of CBC.
- Constitution of Continental Baptist Churches.
- Leonard, Bill, Dictionary of Baptists in America, page 92.
- McBeth, H Leon, The Baptist Heritage: Four Centuries of Baptist Witness, pages 772–773.
- Wardin, Jr., Albert W, The Twelve Baptist Tribes in the USA: a Historical and Statistical Analysis, page 101.
