= Sola 5 =

Southern African Protestant association

Sola5
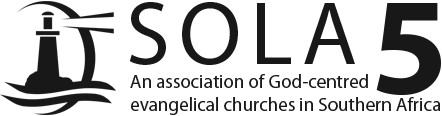
- Theology: Reformed Baptist, Protestant
- Region: Southern Africa
- Origin: 2005; Pretoria, South Africa
- Congregations: 51
- Members: unknown
- Official website: sola5.org

Sola 5 (which replaced the former Reformed Baptist Association of Southern Africa) is an association of Reformed Baptist and other Protestant evangelical churches in the Southern Africa region. The association was founded at the inaugural conference which was held at Pretoria Baptist Church in Pretoria, South Africa during September 29 through October 2 of 2005. Notable current or former individuals associated with the organization include Conrad Mbewe and Voddie Baucham.

== See also ==
- List of Reformed Baptist denominations
