= List of University of West Georgia alumni =

The University of West Georgia is a public university in Carrollton, Georgia. Following are some of its notable alumni.

== Clergy ==
Name	Class	Major	Notability	References
Josh Buice			Christian pastor, author, and the founder and the current president of G3 Ministries	
Creflo Dollar	1984		Televangelist, founder of World Changers Church International CEO of Creflo Dollar Ministries and Arrow Records	

== Education ==
Name	Class	Major	Notability	References
Clarice Cross Bagwell			Educator and activist	
John Barge			Georgia superintendent of schools	
Newt Gingrich			History professor and speaker of the U.S. House of Representatives	
Julian Stanley	1936		Retired professor of psychology and director/founder of the Study of Mathematically Precocious Youth at Johns Hopkins University	

== Entertainment ==
Name	Class	Major	Notability	References
Zac Brown	1997		Grammy-winning country singer, lead vocalist for Zac Brown Band	
Elle Duncan	2005		Sports anchor for ESPN	
C. Michael Greene	1971		Former president/CEO of the National Academy of Recording Arts and Sciences (Grammys)	
Todd Grisham	1998		Former WWE commentator and backstage interviewer	
George Knapp			Television journalist and talk radio host	
Lil Nas X	non-degreed (dropped out)		Rapper known for the hit song "Old Town Road"	

== Literature and journalism ==
Name	Class	Major	Notability	References
David Bottoms			Poet, novelislt, and former poet laureate of Georgia	
Raymond Moody			Author of Life After Life and several others regarding his work on near-death experiences, a term he coined	
Matthew O'Brien			Author and journalist	
Adam Selzer	attended 1999–2001		Author of several novels and books of nonfiction for Random House and others	

== Military ==
Name	Class	Major	Notability	References
John M. Brown III			Lieutenant general of the United States Army	

== Politics ==
Name	Class	Major	Notability	References
Jim Beck			Insurance commissioner of Georgia	
J. Collins			Mayor of Villa Rica, Georgia and member of the Georgia House of Representatives	
Randy Evans			U.S. ambassador to Luxembourg	
Wayne Garner			Georgia State Senate	
Joyce Hearn			South Carolina House of Representatives	
El-Mahdi Holly			Georgia House of Representatives	
Robert R. Hood			Assistant secretary of defense for legislative affairs and head of the Hyundai Motor Company's Washington, D.C. office	
John Meadows III			Mayor of Calhoun, Georgia and member of Georgia House of Representatives	

== Science and medicine ==
Name	Class	Major	Notability	References
David T. Curiel,			Cancer biologist, professor of Radiation Oncology at Washington University School of Medicine, and director of the Biologic Therapeutics Center	
J. Willis Hurs	1938		Cardiologist to President Lyndon B. Johnson and author of The Heart, the premier textbook for cardiologists	

== Sports ==
Name	Class	Major	Notability	References
Tyrell Adams			Buffalo Bills linebacker	
Alex Armah			New Orleans Saints fullback	
Rick Camp			Atlanta Braves pitcher (1976–1985)	
Shea Cowart			2000 Summer Paralympics gold medalist	
Drew Cronic			College football coach	
Barry Evans			Former MLB infielder	
Brandon Jamison			Former NFL linebacker	
Ricky Jones			Former Baltimore Orioles infielder	
Dennison Robinson			Former CFL and Arena Football League defensive back	
Mike Sansing			Former Kennesaw State Owls baseball baseball coach	
Foots Walker			Former NBA player with Cleveland Cavaliers	
Odell Willis			Toronto Argonauts defensive end	
