= G3 Ministries =

American Reformed Baptist ministry and conference organizer

- Abbreviation: G3
- Formation: 2019
- Founder: Josh Buice
- Type: 501(c)(3) nonprofit organization
- Tax ID no.: 84-2403597
- Headquarters: Douglasville, Georgia, U.S. (during G3 operations)
- Former presidents: Josh Buice; Scott Aniol
- Website: g3min.org

G3 Ministries was an American Reformed Baptist nonprofit ministry associated with the G3 Conference (an abbreviation of Gospel, Grace, Glory). Established as a conference in 2013 by pastor Josh Buice in Douglasville, Georgia, G3 subsequently expanded into publishing, theological education and a network of churches. Its nonprofit corporation, G3 Ministries for the Church Inc., was formed in 2019.

G3 announced in August 2026 that it was ending its operations following a controversy involving the anonymous distribution of allegations against a pastor. In November 2026, Protestia reported, citing Georgia corporate filings, that the existing nonprofit had changed its name to Lumena Ministries in October rather than legally dissolving. The renamed ministry said it would continue publishing and digital-resource activities under former G3 operations director Laramie Minga.

== History ==
=== Conference and organizational development ===
The first G3 Conference took place in 2013 at Pray's Mill Baptist Church in Douglasville, where Buice was a pastor. It began as an annual gathering focused on Reformed evangelical theology and later expanded to include national and regional conferences, workshops and other educational events. A 2023 account in Sharper Iron reported that attendance increased from approximately 750 at the first conference to about 5,600 in 2020.

Conference speakers included John MacArthur, Voddie Baucham, James White, Paul Washer, Joel Beeke and Steven Lawson. The ministry's stated purpose was to educate, encourage and equip local churches through biblical teaching and resources.

Although the nonprofit corporation dated to 2019, G3 described its transition from a conference ministry into a broader nonprofit ministry as taking place in 2020. In 2021, it developed the G3 Church Network, intended to connect like-minded Reformed Baptist congregations without constituting a denomination. The network's membership requirements included adherence to the 1689 Baptist Confession of Faith, subject to certain exceptions. By 2025, more than 100 churches were affiliated with the network.

=== Publishing and educational activities ===
Through G3 Press, the organization published Christian books and teaching materials, while also distributing conference recordings and other digital resources. In 2022, it launched the Gloria Deo Journal of Theology, an annual theological journal.

Following leadership changes in 2025, G3 announced a revised approach emphasizing cooperation with local churches, publishing and smaller church-based events rather than reliance on large national conferences.

== Leadership controversies and announced closure ==
=== Resignation of Josh Buice (2025) ===
On May 12, 2025, G3 announced that founder and president Josh Buice had resigned after acknowledging that he had operated anonymous social-media, email and Substack accounts used to criticize other Christian leaders and members of his own church. Buice was also placed on leave from pastoral leadership at Pray's Mill Baptist Church. The ministry's account of the incident stated that its other employees and board members had not known about the accounts.

G3 subsequently removed Buice's material from its platforms and canceled its national conference planned for September 2025. On July 14, it announced the appointment of Scott Aniol as president, effective July 9. Aniol had previously served as executive vice president and editor-in-chief of G3 Press.

=== Anonymous allegations concerning Tom Buck (2026) ===
In August 2026, reports emerged that anonymous letters and packets alleging sermon plagiarism by pastor Tom Buck of First Baptist Church in Lindale, Texas, had been circulated to members of his congregation and to outside ministry associates. The allegations and the manner of their distribution became the subject of public controversy; the plagiarism allegations themselves were disputed.

On August 25, Scott Aniol and three other elders of Pray's Mill Baptist Church—Matt Sikes, Dylan Joyner and Jon Norton—acknowledged having participated in anonymously sending the materials. In a letter to Buck and his church's elders, the four apologized for intervening in another congregation's disciplinary affairs and for distributing the allegations without approaching the church directly. All four resigned from their pastoral positions at Pray's Mill Baptist Church.

=== Closure announcement and Lumena Ministries (2026) ===
On August 25, 2026, G3 informed member churches that it was dissolving the G3 Church Network immediately and canceling recurring membership dues. The following day, it announced the removal of its social-media accounts. Its main website subsequently stated that the ministry was concluding operations, and news outlets reported that G3 had shut down.

At the time of the closure announcement, the ministry was facing declining revenue. According to its 2025 federal tax filing, G3 recorded approximately $400,000 in revenue and $951,000 in expenses, a deficit of roughly $551,000. Its reported revenue in 2024 had been approximately $1.2 million.

On November 17, 2026, Protestia reported that Georgia Secretary of State records showed G3 Ministries for the Church Inc. had changed its corporate name to Lumena Ministries Inc. on October 28, 2026, without dissolving the underlying nonprofit corporation. The report also stated that Laramie Minga, G3's former director of operations, became the renamed organization's chief executive officer. According to an announcement circulated to former G3 supporters, Lumena planned to continue and expand G3's print and digital publishing activities. These corporate developments were reported after G3 had publicly announced the conclusion of its operations under that name.

== See also ==
- Reformed Baptists
- Southern Baptist Convention
- Founders Ministries
