= Michael Haykin =

Michael A. G. Haykin FRHistS
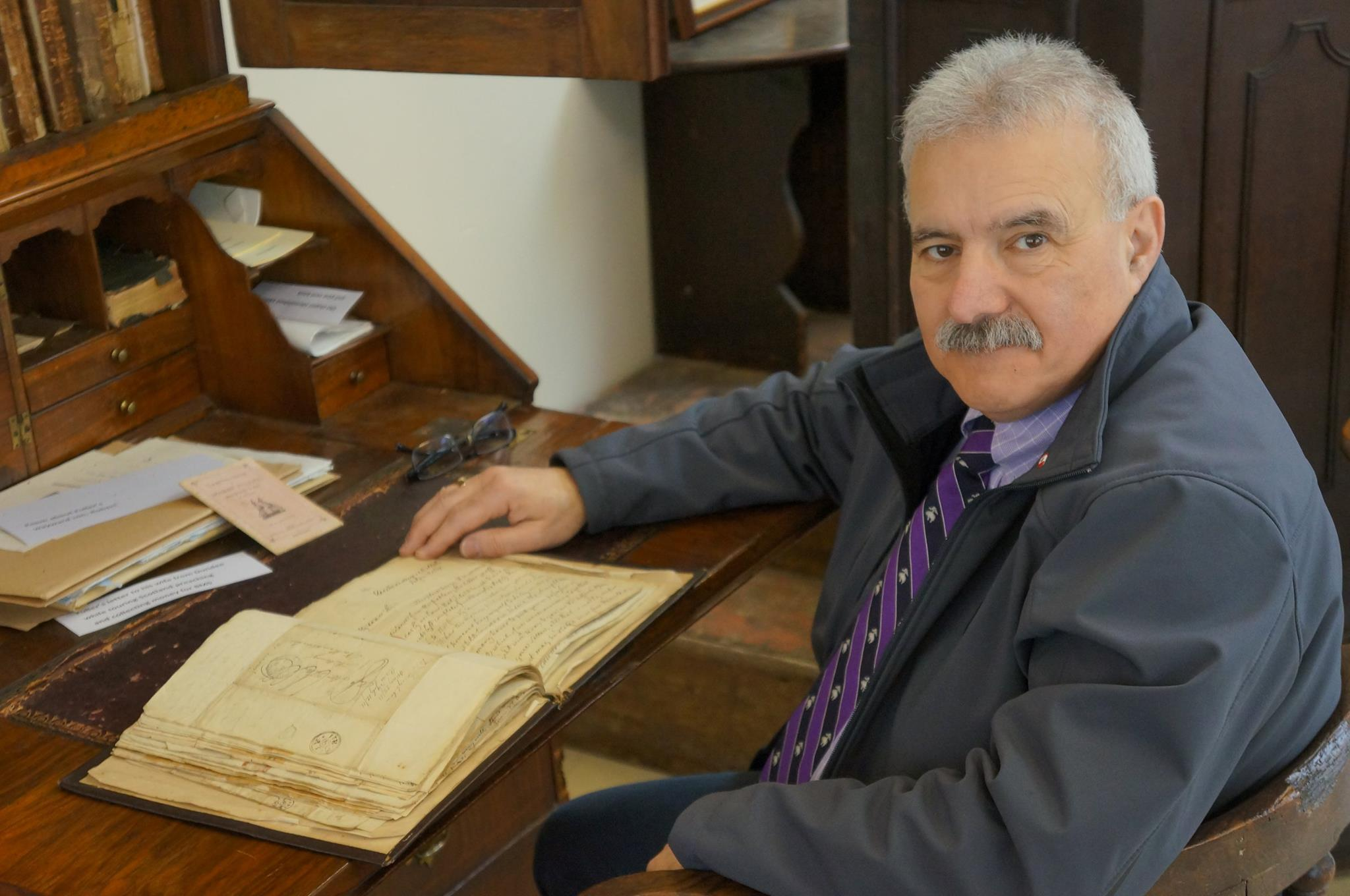
- Born: 1953 (age 72–73); Birmingham, England
- Occupations: Scholar and professor
- Known for: Patristic history, Baptist history, evangelical spirituality
- Spouse: Alison
- Children: 2
- Parent: Simon Haykin

Academic background
- Education: Wycliffe College, Toronto
- Doctoral advisor: John P. Egan

Michael A. G. Haykin (born 1953) is a Canadian theologian who is the Professor of Church History and Biblical Spirituality and Director of The Andrew Fuller Center for Baptist Studies at the Southern Baptist Theological Seminary.

He is the general editor of The Complete Works of Andrew Fuller, a project that publishes "a modern critical edition of the entire corpus of Andrew Fuller's published and unpublished works." Though Haykin was trained as a Patristic scholar, he also developed himself in the area of 18th-century British evangelicalism, particularly the English Particular Baptist history and spirituality.

Haykin is a prolific writer having authored numerous books, over 250 articles, and over 150 book reviews. He is also an editor with numerous editorial credits.

In 2018 Haykin was elected as a Fellow of the Royal Historical Society in recognition of his contributions to historical scholarship. In 2023, he was appointed Senior Research Fellow at the Reformed House of Studies at his alma mater, Wycliffe College, University of Toronto.

== Early life ==
Haykin was born in England of Irish and Kurdish parents. He grew up in Birmingham, England and Coventry, England, before moving to Canada with his family when he was twelve.

Haykin was converted to Christ in 1974. He attended Wycliffe College at the University of Toronto from 1974 to 1982, earning a doctorate in patristics, supervised by John P. Egan, S.J.

== Career ==
Haykin served as principal and professor of church history and biblical spirituality at Toronto Baptist Seminary in Toronto, Ontario, Canada, from 2003 to 2007. Previously, he was a professor at Heritage Theological Seminary from 1993 to 1999 and at Central Baptist Seminary from 1982 to 1993. He was the editorial director of Joshua Press from 1999 to 2002. He was appointed to the faculty of the Southern Baptist Theological Seminary in 2007.

Russell D. Moore, dean of the School of Theology and senior vice president for academic administration at Southern Seminary was quoted as saying:

I sometimes wonder if Michael Haykin is one scholar or a conspiracy of brilliant minds masquerading as one man ... After all, he is a pacesetter in the very different fields of spiritual formation, Baptist studies, patristic history, and beyond. He is one of the most recognized scholars in the world in each of these fields, having written and lectured extensively in each area, even while serving as a seminary administrator, popular conference speaker, and leader within the Canadian Baptist churches.

== Education ==
- B.A. in Philosophy from the University of Toronto (1974),
- M.Rel. from Wycliffe College, University of Toronto (1977),
- Th.D. in Church History from the University of Toronto and Wycliffe College (1982).

== Bibliography ==
- Michael Haykin & Jerry Slate, Loving God and Neighbor with Samuel Pearce, (Lexham Press, 2019) ISBN 978-1683592693
- Michael Haykin & Brian Croft & Ian H. Clary, Being a Pastor: A Conversation with Andrew Fuller, (Evangelical Press, 2019) ISBN 978-1783972746
- Eight Women of Faith, (Crossway, 2016) ISBN 978-1433548925
- Michael Haykin & Matthew Barrett, Owen on the Christian Life: Living for the Glory of God in Christ, (Crossway, 2015) ISBN 978-1433537288
- Michael Haykin, Anthony L. Chute & Nathan A. Finn, The Baptist Story: From English Sect to Global Movement, (B&H Academic, 2015) ISBN 978-1433673757
- Michael Haykin & C. Jeffrey Robertson Sr, To the Ends of the Earth: Calvin's Missional Vision and Legacy, (Crossway, 2014) ISBN 978-1433523540
- Patrick of Ireland: His Life and Impact, (Christian Focus, 2014) ISBN 978-1781913031
- Ardent Love for Jesus: English Baptists and the Experience of Revival in the Long Eighteenth Century, (Evangelical Press, 2013) ISBN 978-1850492481
- The Reformers and Puritans as Spiritual Mentors: Hope Is Kindled, (Sola Scriptura Ministries International, 2012) ISBN 978-1894400398
- Rediscovering the Church Fathers: Who They Were and How They Shaped the Church (Crossway, 2011) ISBN 978-1433510434
- The Empire of the Holy Spirit, (BorderStone Press, LLC 2010). ISBN 978-0-9842284-7-8
- The Christian Lover: The Sweetness of Love and Marriage in the Letters of Believers, (Reformation Trust Publishing, January 31, 2009).
- Michael Haykin, Roger D. Duke & James Fuller, Soldiers of Christ, Selections from the Writings of Basil Manly, Sr. and Basil Manly, Jr. (Founders Press, 2009).
- The God who draws near: An introduction to biblical spirituality (Evangelical Press, 2007).
- Jonathan Edwards: The Holy Spirit in Revival (Evangelical Press, 2005);
- The Pure Fountain of the Word: Andrew Fuller as an Apologist (Paternoster Press, 2004).
- The Armies of the Lamb: The spirituality of Andrew Fuller (Joshua Press, 2001);
- Kiffin, Knollys and Keach: Rediscovering Our English Baptist Heritage (Reformation Today Trust, 1996);
- One heart and one soul: John Sutcliff of Olney, his friends, and his times (Evangelical Press, 1994);
- The Spirit of God: The Exegesis of 1 and 2 Corinthians in the Pneumatomachian Controversy of the Fourth Century (E. J. Brill, 1994).
