= Confessional Baptist Association =

Confessional Baptist Association (CBA)
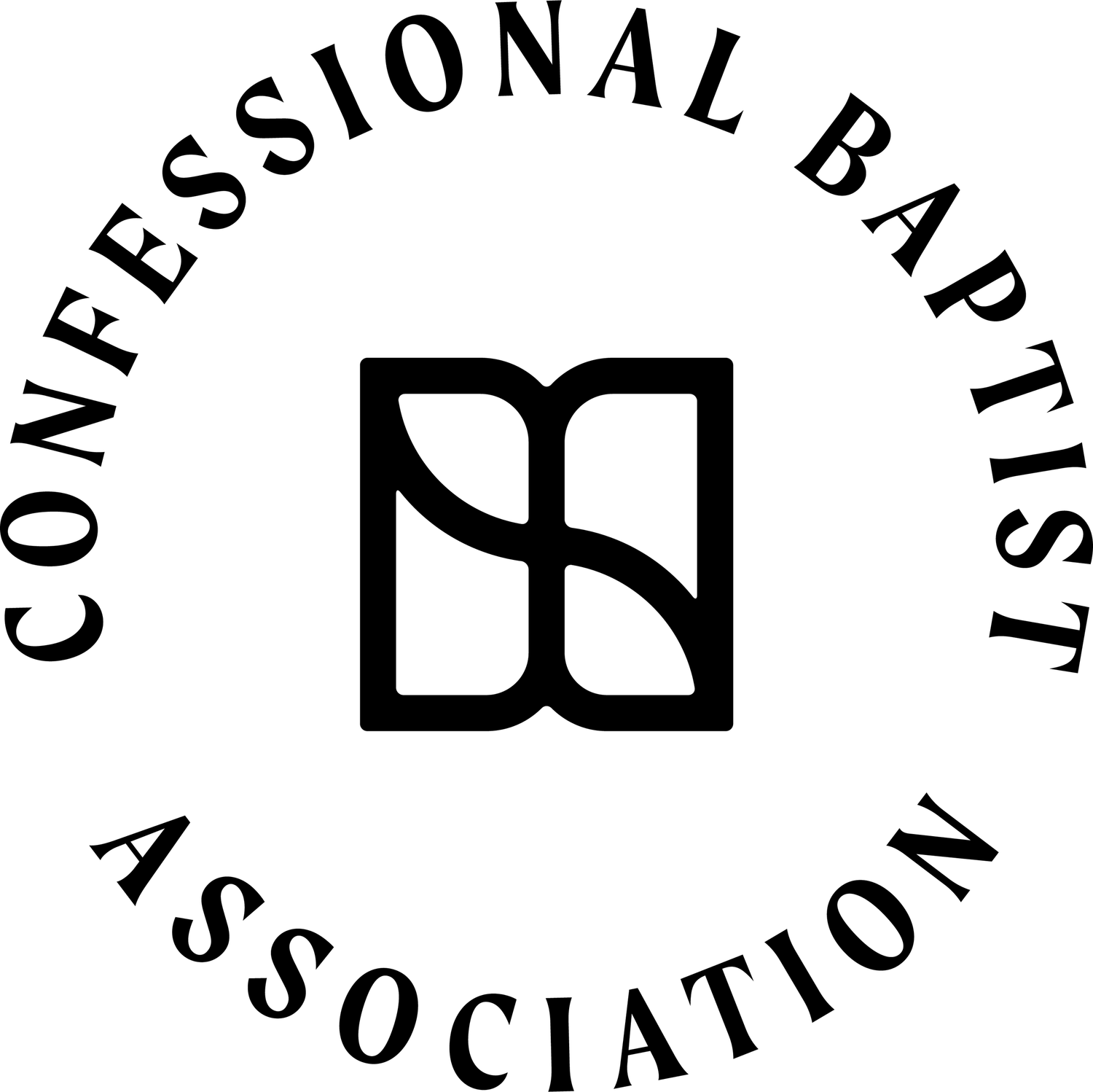
- Abbreviation: CBA
- Formation: 1997
- Headquarters: Mansfield, Texas, U.S.
- Members: 16 churches
- Moderator: Corey Smith
- Website: cba1689.com
- Formerly called: Association of Reformed Baptist Churches in America (ARBCA)

The Confessional Baptist Association, previously known as the Association of Reformed Baptist Churches in America, is an association of Reformed Baptist churches in the United States. The headquarters is in Mansfield, Texas.

== History ==
On November 12–13, 1996, fifteen Reformed Baptist churches met at Heritage Church in Fayetteville, Georgia to begin the planning of a national association of churches. Four months later on March 11, 1997, the Association of Reformed Baptist Churches of America was founded in Mesa, Arizona by 24 member churches from 14 states.

In the mid-2010s, a debate among Reformed Baptists regarding the confessional views on Divine impassibility (with those either holding a "classical" or "modified" position) resulted in a number of churches, that were in favor of the modified position, leaving the organization after it voted to approve and publish a position paper that was in favor of the classical position. Many of the churches that had left ARBCA over the issue later formed the Reformed Baptist Network in 2016, which accommodates for either view.

During the end of the 2010s and the beginning of the 2020s, more ARBCA churches would later leave to join the Reformed Baptist Network following the aftermath of the association's alleged past mishandling/coverup (in 2000–1) of admitting a church into the association with a pastor who was later found to be under criminal investigation for sexual abuse (following the publicizing of letters evidencing that some on the association's councils had known about such abuse at the time, and had sealed reports on the matter).

In 2022, the remaining churches in the organization moved to legally dissolve the current organization, and created a new organization headquartered in Mansfield, Texas named "Confessional Baptist Association" along with a new set of bylaws for the new association. In 2023, the association held its first general assembly at Oak Grove Baptist Church in Angier, North Carolina, which consisted of the 13 founding member churches of the new association.

== Theology ==
The association's churches all subscribe to the 1689 Baptist Confession of Faith. The association's General Assembly has noted that their adherence to this Confession means "the model for (association) churches is Puritan and not one of a number of competing contemporary ones."

== Theological training ==
ARBCA originally founded the Institute of Reformed Baptist Studies (IRBS) at Westminster Seminary California which provides training for seminarians as part of studies toward a Master of Divinity degree program. The seminary is now located on the campus of Heritage Baptist Church in Mansfield, Texas and maintains a relationship with the CBA and other organizations.

== Missions ==
In 2000, ARBCA merged with the Reformed Baptist Mission Services (RBMS), a foreign missions organization. RBMS, though founded 12 years before the ARBCA, had acted as the foreign mission arm of the association, until the dissolution of ARBCA in 2022.

ARBCA was recognized by the U.S. Department of Defense as an endorsing agency for United States military chaplains.

== Church Planting ==
The mission of CBA is to assist local churches in the planting of Reformed Baptist churches that subscribe to the 1689 Baptist Confession of Faith.

In 2023, at the 1st General Assembly, the Confessional Baptist Association conditionally agreed to financially support Redeemer Reformed Baptist Church in Belton, Texas which is an existing church plant of Emmanuel Reformed Baptist Church in Georgetown, Texas. This funding was provided to temporarily assist the pastoral efforts of the Emmanuel Reformed Baptist Church's elders (in their search for a candidate for church planter), until the association's next opportunity to discuss a long-term funding plan for the church plant at the next annual general assembly.

== See also ==
- List of Reformed Baptist denominations
