= Roger Duke =

Roger D. Duke is an author, theologian, educator, itinerant preacher, and was a professor at several institutions of higher learning including Union University, Baptist College of Health Sciences, Liberty University, Memphis Theological Seminary, and Columbia Evangelical Seminary. Professor Duke also serves as a Consulting Editor for B & H Academic's Studies in Baptist Life and Thought series. He retired in 2016 to focus on a speaking and writing career by forming the Duke Consulting Group.

== Education ==
- Doctor of Ministry (D. Min.), May 2003 The University of the South's (Sewanee) School of Theology; Sewanee, Tennessee.
- Ph. D. (Studies), 1997–2000 Studied with John Angus Campbell, The University of Memphis, College of Communication w/Graduate Seminars in: Classical Rhetoric, Contemporary Rhetoric, Rhetorical Theory, Rhetorical Criticism, The Rhetorical Tradition, Political Rhetoric, Rhetoriography, Movie & Media Criticism, Communication Theory, Teaching Communication in College, and Organizational Communication with an Emphasis in Feminist Issues
- Sustaining Pastoral Excellence (SPE): Fall 2004-Spring 2007. This was a three-year research & colleague grant program project funded by The Lily Endowment. The program grant was administered through Memphis Theological Seminary.
- Master of Arts in religion (M. A. R.), May 1996 Harding University Graduate School of Religion, Memphis, Tennessee. Major Concentration: Christian Thought/History of Christian Thought
- Master of Divinity (M. Div.), With Languages, May 1995, Southern Baptist Theological Seminary, Louisville, Kentucky; Major Concentration: Higher Education Track
- Professional Ministerial Studies, 1995, Memphis Theological Seminary, Memphis, Tennessee.
- Bachelor of Science, (B.Sc.), cum laude, May 1987, Crichton College, Memphis, Tennessee, Major: Humanities; Minor: Bible/History.
- Diploma of Theology (Associate of Divinity, A. Div.), May 1985, Mid-America Baptist Theological Seminary, Memphis, Tennessee. Majors: Theology & Pastoral Ministries

== Works ==
=== Books ===
- Duke, R., co-editor with Bob Agee, Reason for the Season, Founders Press, August 30, 2010. ISBN 978-0-9785711-8-4
- Duke, R., co-editor with David S. Dockery, John Albert Broadus: A Living Legacy, B & H Publishing.
- Duke, R., Michael A.G. Haykin & A. James Fuller, "Soldiers of Christ": The Piety of Basil Manly, Sr. and Basil Manly, Jr. Cape Corral, FL: Founders Press.
- Duke, R., Dissertation: "A Rhetorical Taxonomy of the Jubilee 2000 Papal Apology of John Paul II", Thesis Imprints.
- Duke, R., "Baptists, Evangelicals, and Puritans: Essays Presented at The Andrew Fuller Center For Baptist Studies at The Southern Baptist Theological Seminary", Kindle E-book.
- Duke, R., "The Four Callings of William Carey: The Father of Modern Missions", Kindle E-book.
- Duke, R., "John Albert Broadus: Prince of the Southern Baptist Pulpit: A New Collection of Sermons and Lectures Concerning Our Lord Jesus Christ", Kindle E-book.

=== Other writings ===
- (Fall, 2009). "John A. Broadus, Rhetoric, and A Treatise on the Preparation and Delivery of Sermons." Posted on the Baptist History Home Page at https://web.archive.org/web/20091028075702/http://www.geocities.com/baptist_documents/a-recent.documents.html.
- (Fall, 2009). "Perspicuity in the Preaching and Pietistic Thought of Basil Manly, Jr." posted in manuscript form at the https://web.archive.org/web/20091026213355/http://geocities.com/baptist_documents/ web page.
- (Fall, 2009). "Perspicuity in the Preaching and Pietistic Thought of Basil Manly, Jr." Audio of address posted on the Andrew Fuller Center for Biblical Spirituality of The Southern Baptist Theological Seminary. Posted at http://www.andrewfullercenter.org/index.php/conference/baptist-spirituality-historical-perspectives-august-24-25-2009. Conference presentation also posted at http://sbcvoices.com/baptist-spirituality-conference-audio/
- (Summer, 2009). "Perspicuity in the Preaching and Pietistic Thought of Basil Manly, Jr." Founders Journal 77, Can also be accessed at Founders.org.
- (May, 2009). "Whatever Happened to 'The Fall?'" Gospel Witness, Publication of the Jarvis Street Baptist Church, Toronto, Canada.
- (Fall 2008). "'Compel Them to Come In': Posture and Persuasion in the Preaching of Charles Haddon Spurgeon." Founders Journal 74. Can be accessed at http://www.founders.org/journal/fj74/article1.html.
- (Summer, 2008). "Studies in Philippians," Bible Conference Presentation, Choteau Baptist Church, Choteau, Montana.
- (Fall, 2006). Book Review: Theory and Practice in Old Testament Ethics. By John Rogerson. New York: T & T Clark International, 2004. Submitted to Journal of the Evangelical Theological Society for the Fall 2006 publication.
- (Fall, 2004). "Some Thoughts on Theodicy." Published on-line 12-1-04 at Columbia Evangelical Seminary Coffee Talks #96. Available: http://www.ces.edu.
- (Spring, 2004). "A Southern Baptist Looks at the Theology of James Cone: Or "Can a Southern Baptist Talk to a Liberation Theologian?" Published on-line 4-14-04 at Reformed Writings Journal. Available: http://reformedwritings. home.comcast.net/.
- (2003) Book review: The Revenge of Conscience: Politics and The Fall of Man. By J. Budziszewski. Dallas TX: Spence Publishing Co., 1999. Submitted to Perspectives in Religious Studies Journal on Jan. 1st, 2004 for publication in the Spring quarterly.
- (2003) Book review: Liberty and Justice for All: Racial Reform and the Social Gospel (1877–1925), The Rauschenbusch Lectures, New Series, II. By Ronald C.White Jr. Louisville KY: Westminster John Knox, 2002. Submitted to Perspectives in Religious Studies Journal on Jan. 1st, 2004 for publication in the Spring quarterly.
- (2003). "John Bunyan's Place in Spiritual Theology." Published on-line 1-2-04 at Reformed Writings Journal. Available: http://reformedwritings.home.comcast.net/.
- (2003). "A Rhetorical Taxonomy of the Jubilee 2000 Papal Apology of John Paul II." Dissertation presented to The University of the South's (Sewanee) School of Theology. May, 2003.
- (2003). "A Rhetorical Analysis of Resolution No. 1: On Racial Reconciliation of the 150th Anniversary of the Southern Baptist Convention at the June 1995 Meeting in Atlanta, Georgia." Published on-line 12-1-03 at Reformed Writings Journal. Available: http://reformedwritings.home.comcast.net/.
- (Summer, 2001). "The Theology of James Cone." Seminar paper. Course P.T. 30, D. Min. Ministry Seminar. The University of the South's School of Theology.
- (Fall, 1999). "A Short Contrast Between the Foundational Hermeneutic of Rabbinic Judaism and Evangelical Christianity." Seminar paper. Contemporary Rhetoric, Ph.D. Seminar. The University of Memphis.
- (Fall, 1997). "Lee Atwater: Machiavellian or Gamemaker." Seminar paper. Political Communication, Course 8013, Ph.D. Seminar. The University of Memphis.
- (Spring, 1997). "Is Euthanasia Always Wrong?" Seminar paper. Theory of Practical Reason, Course 7360, Ph.D. Seminar. The University of Memphis.
