= Fellowship of Independent Reformed Evangelicals =

The Fellowship of Independent Reformed Evangelicals (FIRE) is a Reformed Baptist network of churches founded in 2000. There are congregations in the United States and abroad. It provides a platform for fellowship, cooperation, and mission sending. All ministry, cooperation, missions, and meetings are at the initiative of member churches.

== Doctrine ==
The Denomination adheres to the Second London Baptist Confession of Faith 1689 and the London Confession of Faith 1644 and also affirm the Solas of the Reformation:

- Sola Scriptura - Scripture Alone
- Sola Fide - Faith Alone
- Soli Deo Gloria - the Glory of God Alone
- Solus Christus - Christ Alone
- Sola Gratia - Grace Alone

A church elder in the denomination's Campbelltown, Pennsylvania church described his church as "very traditionally-minded", and as "going back to basics and returning to what a traditional church is".

== Members ==
FIRE consists of over 120 churches in the United States and internationally in Brazil, Canada, Spain, West Indies, Israel, Italy, India and Mauritius. While voting membership is restricted to churches, individuals also participate in this network of churches through a provision for individual membership.

== Missions ==
Member churches sponsor missionaries in the Philippines, Spain, France, Mexico, Montenegro, South Africa, Israel, Mozambique, Ireland.
