= Fellowship of Reformed Baptist Churches in New Zealand =

The Fellowship of Reformed Baptist Churches in New Zealand is a Reformed Baptist denomination in New Zealand. It holds to the early creeds the Apostles Creed, Athanasian Creed and Nicene Creed, and also to the Reformation distinctives, the Belgic Confession, the Canons of Dort, Heidelberg Catechism and the Westminster Confession of Faith and also to the five solae. The 1689 Baptist Confession of Faith is the Reformed Baptist Confession.

== Origin ==
The first Reformed Baptist congregations in New Zealand began in the 1970s. In that time no formal denominational ties were between this churches, though they worked together, to support themselves. In March, 2002 discussion begun to form an official association. This led in 2005 to the formation of the Fellowship of Reformed Baptist Churches in New Zealand.

Currently there are ten congregations, located in Auckland, Hamilton, Palmerston North, Wellington, Christchurch and Timaru.
