= Statement on Social Justice and the Gospel =

Evangelical Christian statement

The Statement on Social Justice and the Gospel, also known as the Dallas Statement, is an evangelical Christian statement of faith addressing the perceived trend that some prominent evangelicals tend to mix the Christian Gospel with the social gospel. Signatories claim that the rising social justice movement within American evangelicalism endangers Christians with "an onslaught of dangerous and false teachings that threaten the gospel, misrepresent Scripture, and lead people away from the grace of God in Jesus Christ."

== Contents ==
The statement includes an introduction and 14 articles. Over the course of the 14 sections, the statement addresses cultural narratives "currently undermining Scripture in the areas of race and ethnicity, manhood and womanhood, and human sexuality" and argues that a secular threat is infiltrating the evangelical church.

Through this statement,

we deny that the postmodern ideologies derived from intersectionality, radical feminism, and critical race theory are consistent with biblical teaching.

== History ==
The statement grew out of a meeting of a group of evangelicals that took place on June 19, 2018, in Dallas, Texas, organized by Josh Buice. Tom Ascol was given the responsibility to write the original draft, which upon revision was signed first by the original summit attendees also including James White, John MacArthur, Voddie Baucham, and others. Over ten thousand churches or individuals have since added their signatures.

While the statement was intended to address ideas and doctrines, not people or organizations, the statement is seen as a response to the evangelical drift away from the gospel towards an emphasis on social justice, the latter seen as a political philosophy produced by the Frankfurt School that is a conglomeration of critical race theory, cultural Marxism, Rauschenbuschism, and intersectionality.

== Criticism ==
A number of prominent evangelicals have critiqued the statement, seeing social justice as not contradictory to the gospel message. John Carpenter (a The Gospel Coalition contributor) lamented on The Christian Post that the statement demonstrated "the scandal of the evangelical conscience" because its primary drafters, like John MacArthur, had demonstrated few, if any, objections to racial injustice, even during the civil rights movement. Carpenter, also wrote that the statement represented a rise of a movement of "social justice contras," especially after some of its drafters, like James White, protested the refusal of Albert Mohler, Mark Dever, and others to explain their refusal to sign the statement at John MacArthur's 2019 Shepherd's Conference.

Other critiques have been levied against the lack of clarity in the statement, especially on the definition of terms such as "social justice," "reconciliation," "intersectionality," or "critical race theory."
