= Reformed Baptist Network =

Reformed Baptist church association

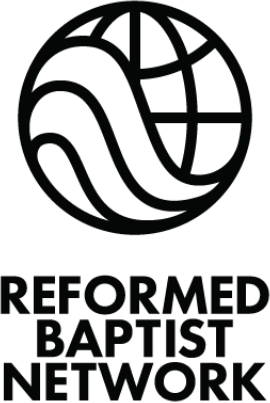
- Abbreviation: RBNet
- Formation: November 15, 2016
- Purpose: Religious
- Headquarters: Grand Rapids, Michigan, U.S.
- Members: 76 (churches); Unknown (individuals)
- Coordinator: Mark Chanski
- Website: reformedbaptistnetwork.com

The Reformed Baptist Network (abbreviated as RBNet) is an international association of Reformed Baptist churches (with most being in North America) and individuals, that confess the 1689 Baptist Confession of Faith. The organization was founded on November 15, 2016 at the founding conference held at the Reformed Baptist Church of Northern Colorado in Boulder, Colorado. The legal headquarters is currently based at Grace Immanuel Reformed Baptist Church in Grand Rapids, Michigan. The first general assembly was held at Grace Baptist Church in Taylors, South Carolina.

As of July 2025, the Reformed Baptist Network has 76 member churches and is the largest international association of Reformed Baptist churches.

== See also ==
- List of Reformed Baptist denominations
- Reformed Baptists
- 1689 Baptist Confession of Faith
