= Albert N. Martin =

American Reformed Baptist minister (1934–2026)

Pastor Albert Martin
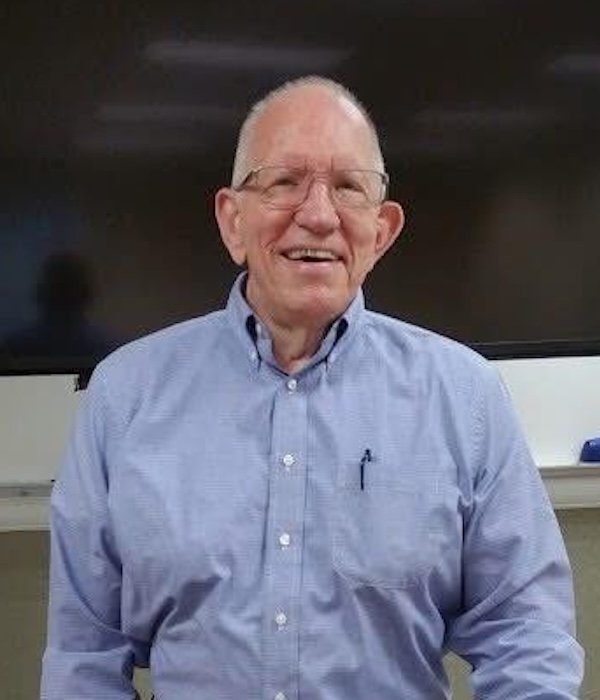
- Martin teaching Sunday School
- Born: Albert Newton Martin; April 11, 1934; Alexandria, Virginia, U.S.
- Died: April 7, 2026 (aged 91)
- Spouse(s): Marilyn (died 2004); Dorothy (died 2020)
- Theological work
- Tradition or movement: Reformed Baptist

Albert Newton Martin (April 11, 1934 – April 7, 2026) was an American Reformed Baptist minister.

== Biography ==
Martin was born in Alexandria, Virginia, on April 11, 1934. He studied at Bob Jones University and Columbia Bible College and served as an itinerant preacher from 1957 to 1961. In 1962 he accepted a call to a Christian and Missionary Alliance congregation in North Caldwell, New Jersey. Over the next few years he became Calvinistic in his theology and in 1967 the church reconstituted as Trinity Baptist Church, adopting the 1689 Baptist Confession of Faith. Martin served as a pastor there until 2008.

Martin wrote a number of books on homiletics, including Preaching in the Holy Spirit (2011), in which he describes the specific manifestations of the Spirit in preaching as "a heightened sense, unfettered liberty, an enlarged heart, and a heightened confidence in the Word."

He taught for many years at the Trinity Ministerial Academy in Montville, New Jersey, and wrote a three-volume Pastoral Theology based on lectures he delivered there. This has been translated into multiple languages, including Spanish.

After the death of his first wife, Marilyn, he preached a series to his congregation on grieving the death of a believing loved one, later turned into a book called Grieving, Hope and Solace.

In 2021, a Festschrift was published in his honor: A Workman Not Ashamed: Essays in Honor of Albert N. Martin.

John Murray called him "one of the ablest and moving preachers I have ever heard".

Martin died on April 7, 2026, four days before his 92nd birthday.
