= Comunhão Reformada Batista do Brasil =

Church federation in Brazil

Comunhão Reformada Batista do Brasil (or Reformed Baptist Communion of Brazil in English) was a federation of Reformed Baptist churches in Brazil. It was founded on June 10, 2004 in Petrolândia, Pernambuco by individuals from different denominations that subscribed to the 1689 Baptist Confession of Faith in Brazil. The fellowship of churches were theologically Reformed (but credobaptist), and subscribed to the doctrines of the Five Solas (Sola Scriptura, Solus Christus, Soli Deo Gloria, Sola Fide, and Sola Gratia). The organization was dissolved sometime following the 6th Congress meeting that was held in 2011. Many Reformed Baptist churches in Brazil now belong to the Convenção Batista Reformada do Brasil (or Reformed Baptist Convention of Brazil), which was founded during the 500th anniversary of the Protestant Reformation on October 31, 2017.

== See also ==
- Reformed Baptists
- Reformed tradition
- List of Reformed Baptist denominations
- 1689 Baptist Confession of Faith
