= Evangelical Reformed Baptist Churches in Italy =

- Classification: Protestant
- Orientation: Calvinist
- Theology: Reformed Baptist
- Polity: Congregational
- Associations: World Reformed Fellowship; Italian Evangelical Alliance
- Region: Italy
- Origin: April 25, 2006; Bologna, Italy
- Congregations: 14
- Members: unknown

The Evangelical Reformed Baptist Churches in Italy (Italian: Chiese Evangeliche Riformate Battiste in Italia), or CERBI, is an association of Reformed Baptist churches formed on 25 April 2006 in Bologna.

== Theology ==
The CERBI is part of the Reformed family of churches and recognises the great reformers such as Martin Luther, John Calvin, Peter Martyr Vermigli, John Knox, Roger Williams and Giovanni Diodati. CERBI supports the separation between church and state in Italy.

The group adheres to the

- 1689 Baptist Confession of Faith
- Cambridge Declaration of 1996,

The Evangelical Reformed Baptist Churches in Italy recognise the supreme authority of the Scriptures and the importance of the interdependence of the local churches. They further recognise the importance of establishing and maintaining constructive relationships between the cultural mandate and the missionary mandate.

== Social issues ==
The denomination is committed to gospel proclamation and transformation in Italy. One associated church runs the publishing house Alpha&Omega. The CERBI churches benefit from the activities of IFED (Istituto di Formazione Evangelica e Documentazione in Padova) for theological training. They also support the Committee of Evangelical Teachers in Italy.

== Statistics ==
Fourteen churches in Italy are associated with this network, which places great emphasis on evangelisation and wishes to plant churches across Italy. In 2010 new churches were started in Rome and new projects are underway in Verona and Sicily.

Currently there are churches in Rome, Ferrara, Chieti, Trent, Milan, Modena, Vicenza, Padua, Verona and Caltanissetta. Other churches who are not part of this association describe themselves as Reformed Baptists in Agrigento, Rome, Modena, Teramo, Pescara and other Italian cities.

== Interchurch relations ==
The denomination is a member of the Italian Evangelical Alliance and of World Reformed Fellowship.
