= Erroll Hulse =

Reformed Baptist pastor

Erroll Hulse (3 March 1931 – 3 August 2017) was a Reformed Baptist pastor.

Hulse was born in Fort Beaufort, South Africa and studied at the University of Pretoria. He was converted through the preaching of the itinerant evangelist, Ivor Powell, and moved to the United Kingdom to study at the London Bible College. Hulse became a Calvinist through reading Robert Haldane's commentary on Romans and joined with Iain Murray in the establishment of the Banner of Truth Trust, serving as its first manager from 1957 to 1967. After this he became pastor of Cuckfield Baptist Church, where he served until 1985. In 1970 started Reformation Today magazine, which he edited until 2013.

Hulse was "greatly concerned for authentic spiritual revival." Tim Grass notes that "humanly speaking, he was a man who could 'think big' and secure the co-operation of others to turn his dreams into reality." As well as Reformation Today, Hulse also started the Carey Conference and the African Pastors’ Conference.
