= American Gospel =

- Original film poster
- Directed by: Brandon Kimber
- Produced by: Brandon Kimber
- Production company: Transition Studios
- Distributed by: American Gospel Motion Picture, LLC
- Release dates: 2018 (Christ Alone); 2019 (Christ Crucified)
- Country: United States
- Language: English

American Gospel is a documentary series proposing that Christianity has been distorted through American culture. Two films have been produced to date: American Gospel: Christ Alone (2018) and American Gospel: Christ Crucified (2019). The former deals with the Word of Faith movement and prosperity theology, while the latter addresses theological liberalism and the meaning of the atonement. The series is the basis for a streaming service, AGTV. A docuseries, American Gospel: Spirit & Fire, followed in 2026, critically examining the view of the Holy Spirit taught in the New Apostolic Reformation movement.

== Perspective ==
The films adopt a Reformed theological perspective. They feature interviews with Voddie Baucham, Alistair Begg, Matt Chandler, Bryan Chapell, Alisa Childers, R. Scott Clark, Ray Comfort, Mark Dever, Kevin DeYoung, Costi Hinn, Michael Horton, Jackie Hill Perry, Julius Kim, John F. MacArthur, Nabeel Qureshi (who died in 2017, before the first film was released), and Paul Washer. Christ Crucified also has interviews with Bart Campolo and Tony Jones, whose views are being critiqued.

== Reception and critiques ==
The series has had a mixed reception among the Christian community.

=== Critical ===
Writing against the films in Baptist News Global, Rick Pidcock called Christ Alone "small-minded and abusive", and said that Christ Crucified was "stuck in a time warp." Catholic Answers apologist Trent Horn, meanwhile, commended the series for its critique of prosperity theology but accused it of misrepresenting and distorting the teachings of the Catholic Church, particularly with its claims that Catholicism is a "plus religion" that opposed "those who were holding a biblical gospel", saying that the series is "just flat out wrong when it tries to refute the Catholic plan of salvation with the biblical gospel."

=== Favorable ===
Speaking in favor of the film and its mission, Owen Strachan of The Gospel Coalition stated that Christ Alone "champions the true, saving gospel, and it unpacks this message with clarity and conviction." Ben Ditzel of the Worship through Song Project commended the production of Christ Alone stating it lays out "boldly, clearly, and concisely what the gospel of Jesus Christ is" and the film calls out prosperity teachers' "misleading and Gospel-deprived promissory messages of so called health, wealth, and happiness."
