= Josh Buice =

American pastor (born 1977)

- Born: Joshua S. Buice; June 14, 1977 (age 49); Atlanta, Georgia, U.S.
- Occupations: Pastor, author, theologian
- Spouse: Kari Buice
- Writing career
- Genres: Theology, culture
- Website: g3min.org

Joshua S. (Josh) Buice (born June 14, 1977) is a Christian author and attends Pray's Mill Baptist Church in Douglasville, Georgia, where he had previously served as pastor for 15 years. He founded (and was a former president of) the now defunct G3 Ministries.

== Biography ==
Buice served as a pastor of Pray's Mill Baptist Church in Douglasville, Georgia since August 2010 until May 2025. He has a B.S.B.A. from the University of West Georgia (2001) and has also earned M.Div and D.Min degrees from the Southern Baptist Theological Seminary in Louisville, Kentucky. As of April 2023, Grace Bible Theological Seminary (GPTS) announced that Buice will begin serving as an assistant professor of preaching at the seminary.

=== G3 Ministries ===
Buice is the Founder and formerly served (resigned on May 12, 2025) as the President of G3 Ministries. G3 began with the first G3 Conference (Gospel – Grace – Glory) in 2013, which was held on the campus of Pray's Mill Baptist Church in Douglasville, Georgia where Josh Buice serves as Pastor. As the conference grew, a 501(c)(3) organization had been formed in 2020 during the COVID-19 pandemic to become a ministry organization that hosts the G3 Conference biennially, along with other workshops and trainings, and to provide various theological multimedia resources for local churches.

=== Statement on Social Justice and the Gospel ===
In June 2018, Buice organized a meeting in Dallas, Texas with other conservative evangelicals to address the issue of a rising social justice movement among American Evangelicals. Buice and others claimed that those in that movement were mixing the Christian Gospel and the social gospel, which led to the drafting of the Statement on Social Justice and the Gospel (which is also referred to as "The Dallas Statement").

Tom Ascol was given the responsibility to write the original draft, which upon revision was signed first by the original summit attendees also including James White, John MacArthur, Voddie Baucham, and others. Over ten thousand churches or individuals have since added their signatures on the website that was for the statement.

=== Exit from the Southern Baptist Convention ===
In January 2022, Buice announced that Pray's Mill Baptist Church was leaving the Southern Baptist Convention, claiming that leaders in the SBC were "behind the scenes" working on a "devious deconstruction plan" for the convention, and that the convention had largely shifted away from a theologically conservative denomination towards a more liberal-influenced one.

=== Removed as president of G3 Ministries ===
On May 12, 2025, G3 Ministries announced the resignation of Josh Buice as president due to inappropriate conduct. Buice was also placed on indefinite leave as an elder at Pray's Mill Baptist Church. According to G3, Buice had multiple anonymous social media accounts and substack accounts he had used to purposefully slander G3 speakers and fellow leaders at his own local church:

Dr. Buice had been asked on multiple occasions over the past two years whether he had any connection to these anonymous accounts. In each case, he denied any knowledge of them. On Sunday evening, May 4, 2025, after clear and comprehensive evidence emerged linking the accounts directly to him, the elders of PMBC confronted Josh. For some time, he continued to deny his involvement. Only after further evidence was presented and much pleading with him to walk in the light did Josh finally confess to his actions. Since then, Josh has acknowledged his sin, expressed sorrow, and asked for forgiveness. His desire is to personally ask forgiveness of every person he has slandered or lied to. While Josh has acknowledged with the elders that he is presently disqualified from serving as an elder, we do not believe at this time that his sin is necessarily permanently disqualifying. Accordingly, his content will remain accessible via the G3 website and G3+. To be clear, no other employee or board member of G3 knew Josh was engaged in this activity; he acted alone.

A few days later Buice acknowledged making "unsubstantiated and sinful remarks" against Voddie Baucham. Buice had used a fake email address to send anonymous allegations about Baucham to The Roys Report.

== Publications ==
- The New Calvinism: New Reformation or Theological Fad? (Author)
