= Ernest Reisinger =

Ernest C. Reisinger (16 November 1919 – 31 May 2004) was an American Reformed Baptist pastor who played a key part in the Southern Baptist Convention conservative resurgence.

Between 1979 and 1982, Reisinger distributed 12,000 copies of James Petigru Boyce's Abstract of Systematic Theology to seminary students and graduates. This led to the establishment of Founders Ministries.
