= Homerton Baptist Church =

- Homerton Baptist Church
- 51°32′45.6″N 0°2′31.2″W
- Location: Barnabas Road, Homerton, London
- Country: England
- Denomination: Baptist
- Website: www.homerton.church

History
- Founded: 1817

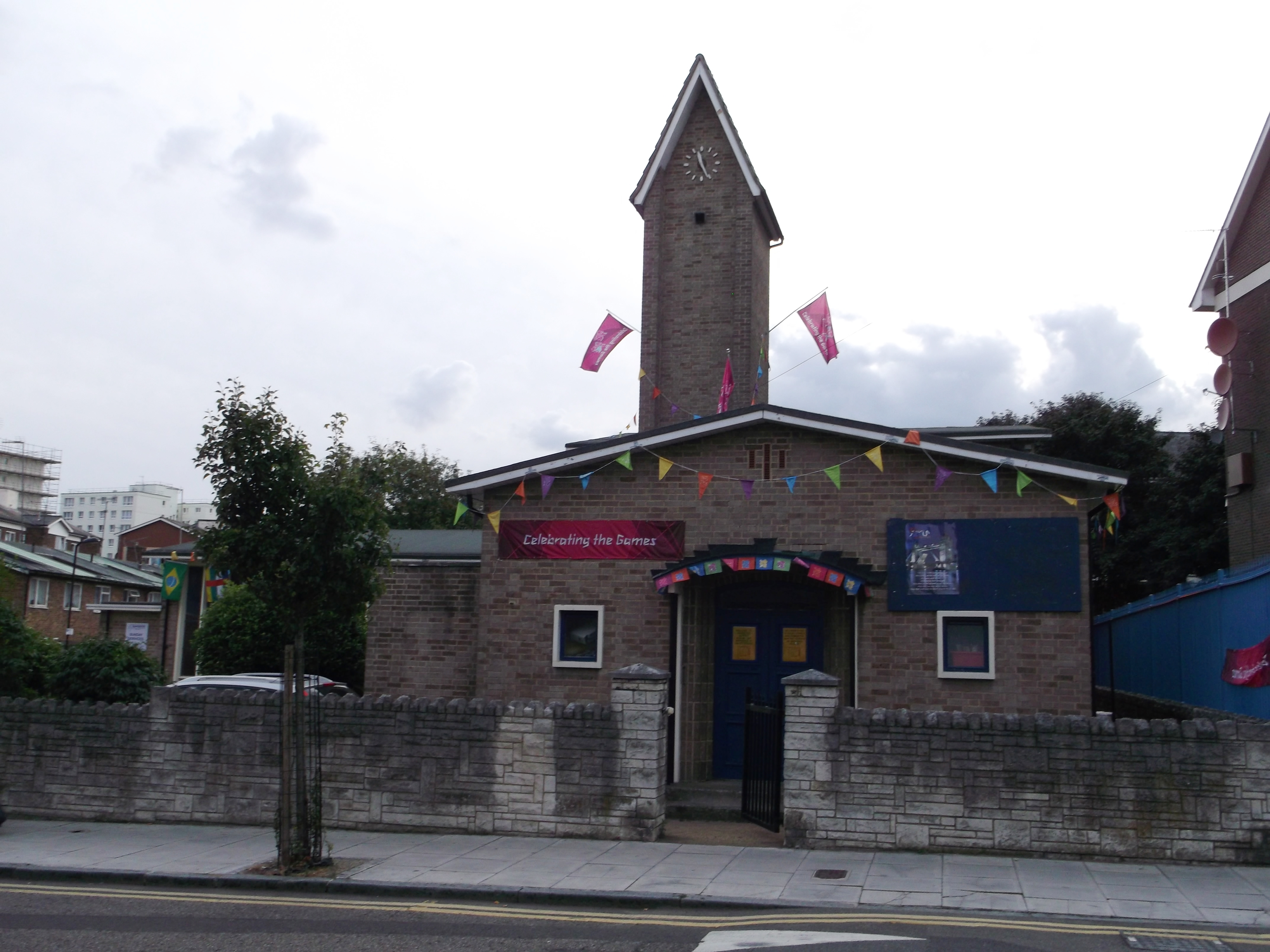
Homerton Baptist Church in 2012

Homerton Baptist Church is a Baptist fellowship in Homerton, England, affiliated with the Association of Grace Baptist Churches (South East).

== History ==
The church was founded in 1817. In 1820 the church secured a site in Homerton Row, which they duly registered and a new purpose build premises was erected and registered 1822. The new premises was called Homerton Row Chapel. In 1871 the church joined the Metropolitan Association of Strict Baptist Churches and renamed as Homerton Row Baptist Chapel.

In 1962 the land was subject to local authority compulsory purchase order. The site was redeveloped by the local authority, expanding Homerton Row School situated next door itself having been established by Ram's Chapel. The school was later known as Homerton House School. It was later named Upton House Comprehensive School, and then replaced by a new school City Academy, Hackney, build in 2009.

During the late 1990s the name was changed to Homerton Baptist Church to reflect its local heritage. In June 2016 the local authority provided planning permission for the redevelopment of the premises.

In 2018, it opened a mixed-use 24 apartments building with a church sanctuary.

== Sources ==
- "Hackney: Protestant Nonconformity". British History Online. 1995.
- "Our History". Homerton Baptist Church. 2016.
- "Directory". Hackney Borough Council.
- "Statement of Significance" (PDF). Planning Office. Hackney Borough Council.
- "Baptist Pastors and Chapels database". Strict Baptist Historical Society.

Books

- Registrar-General (1842). Lists of chapels belonging to the Church of England. p. 74.
