= Kew Baptist Church =

Church in London, England

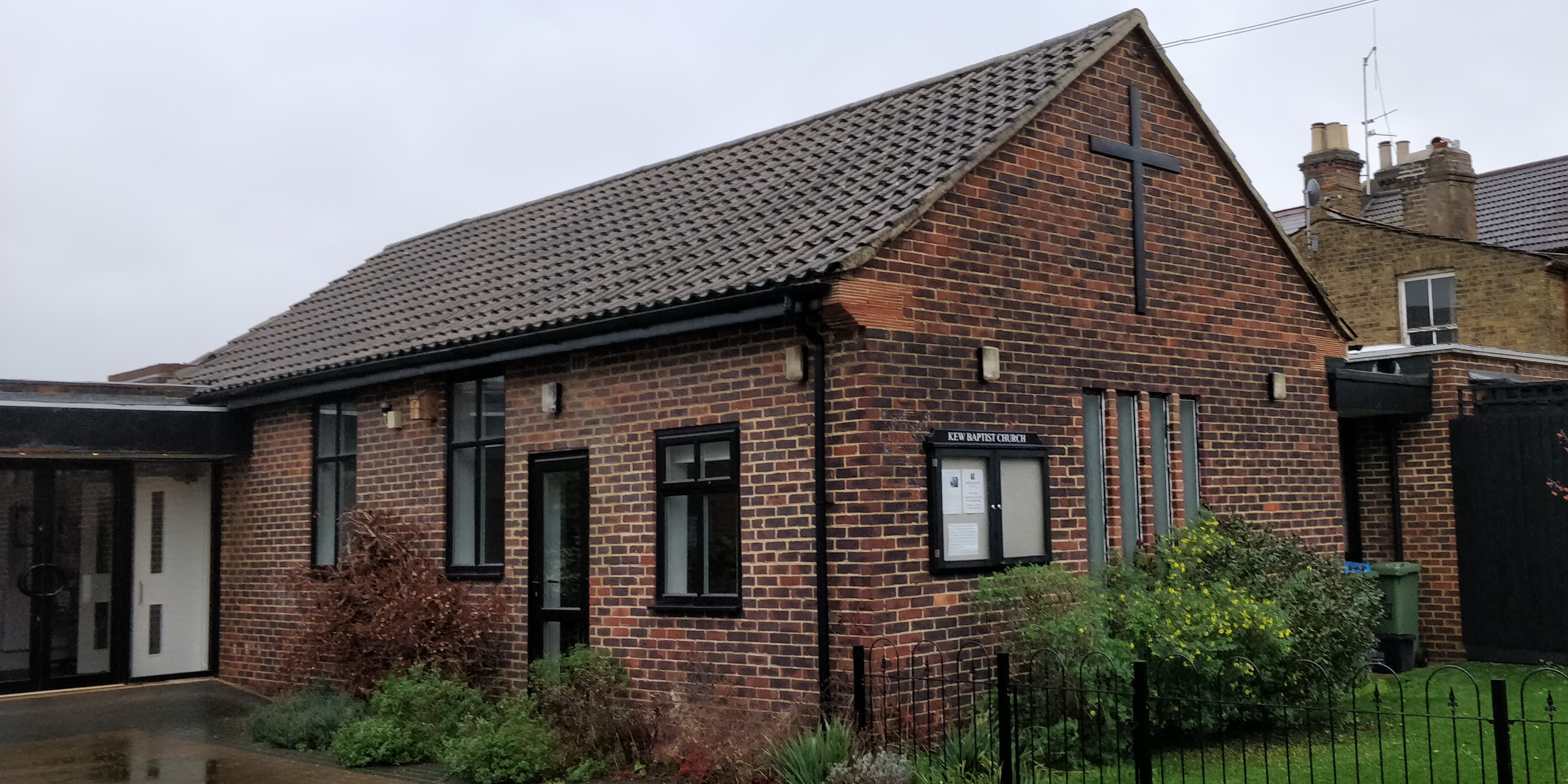
- Kew Baptist Church
- 51°28′20.1″N 0°17′14.7″W
- Location: 2a Windsor Road, Richmond, London TW9 2EL
- Country: England
- Denomination: Baptist

History
- Founded: 1861 (in Richmond, as Salem Baptist Church)

Kew Baptist Church was an independent evangelical fellowship affiliated to the Association of Grace Baptist Churches (South East). The church met, until its closure in 2020, in Windsor Road in Kew in the London Borough of Richmond upon Thames, south west London.

The church was founded in 1861 in Richmond, as Salem Baptist Church. (Note: Salem Baptist Church's archives, dating back to 1861, are held at the Surrey History Centre. "Salem Baptist Chapel, Park Shot, Richmond". National Register of Archives. The National Archives (United Kingdom). Archived from the original on 2 December 2013.) It met at 5 Parkshot, a Grade II listed building near Richmond Green. The church moved to Windsor Road, Kew in 1973 and changed its name to Kew Baptist Church in 1990.

The church closed in December 2020 after a motion to do so was passed unanimously by its members.

== Sources ==
- Dawson, Tim (August 2012). "The Old School, Park Lane, Richmond, London Borough of Richmond: Desk Based Heritage Assessment" (PDF). Thames Valley Archaeological Services. Archived from the original (PDF) on 2 December 2013.
