= Reformed Baptist Fellowship of India =

The Reformed Baptist Fellowship is a group of churches which adhere to the 1689 Baptist Confession of Faith in south India.

== Churches in the Fellowship ==
- Reformed Baptist Missionaries (RBM), Vijayawada,, Andhra Pradesh, South India
- Reformed Baptists India (RBI), Vijayawada,, Andhra Pradesh, South India
- Reformed Baptist Church, Salem-636008, Tamil Nadu, South India
- Evangelical Baptist Church, Madurai-625005, Tamil Nadu, South India
- Trinity Tamil Baptist Church, Keerambur-637207, Tamil Nadu, South India
- Grace Evangelical Church, Malayoor-622301, Tamil Nadu, South India
- Grace Reformed Baptist Church, Kolli Hills-637411, Tamil Nadu, South India
- Reformed Baptist Church, Hanur-571439, Karnataka, South India
- Reformed Baptist Church, Pudukottai-622001, Tamil Nadu, South India
- Reformed Baptist church, Coimbatore-641045, Tamil Nadu, South India
- Good Shepherd Reformed Baptist Church, Yercaud-636601, Tamil Nadu, South India
- Grace Reformed Baptist Church, Pennadam-606105
- Grace Evangelical Church, P.Kulavaipatti, Karambakudi- 622301, Pudukkottai
- Reformed Baptist Church, Vinukonda, Guntur( District), Andhra Pradesh.
