= Covenant Baptist Theological Seminary =

Baptist seminary in Owensboro, Kentucky, US

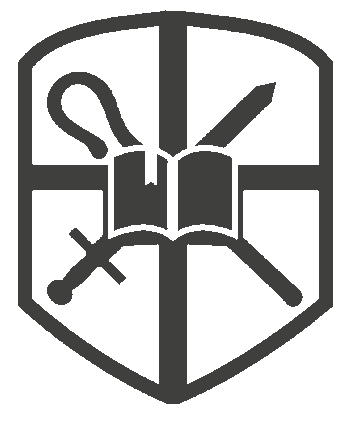
- Motto: Informed Scholarship, Pastoral Heart.
- Type: Private seminary
- Established: 2005; 21 years ago
- Accreditation: Association of Reformed Theological Seminaries
- Religious affiliation: Mid-America Reformed Baptist Association of Churches
- President: Sam Waldron
- Students: ~470
- Location: Owensboro, Kentucky, United States
- Campus: Suburban
- Website: cbtseminary.org

Covenant Baptist Theological Seminary (CBTS) is a Reformed Baptist seminary in Owensboro, Kentucky, on the premises of Grace Reformed Baptist Church and led by President Sam Waldron. CBTS trains people who hold to the 1689 Baptist Confession of Faith to lead churches, domestically and internationally.

== History ==
The Seminary was originally founded in 2005 as the Midwest Center for Theological Studies by Ted Christman, then pastor of Heritage Baptist Church in Owensboro, Kentucky. The seminary began with one faculty member, Sam Waldron, using a single classroom at Heritage Christian School. In August 2007 the seminary expanded temporarily to two rooms of a local law office, while the church made plans to build a $5.5 million, 38,000-square-foot addition to Heritage School. At that time, thirty to thirty-five students were taught by three faculty, including Waldron, with three adjunct professors.

In 2015 the board of directors adopted the name Covenant Baptist Theological Seminary "in order to more clearly to indicate both the mission of the Seminary and its theological viewpoint". The seminary was recognized by the Association of Reformed Theological Seminaries in 2019, and started offering the Master of Divinity (M. Div), a standard theological degree.

In June 2023 the Seminary moved into the newly renovated property of Grace Reformed Church of Owensboro giving it greater capacity for enrollment.

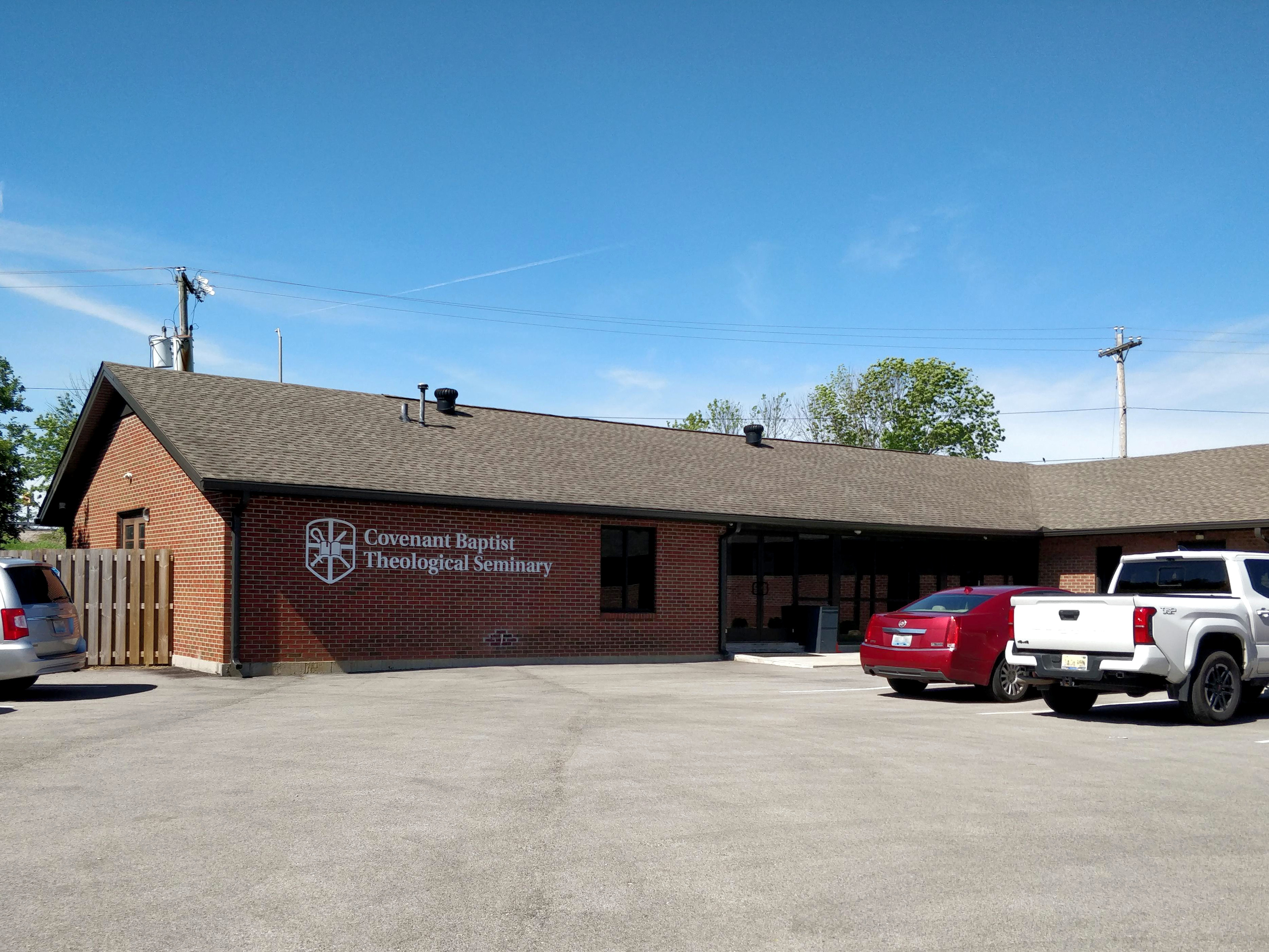
The CBTS wing of Grace Reformed Baptist Church's building in Owensboro.

== Academics ==
The Seminary's academic offerings include the Master of Divinity (MDiv), Master of Arts in Theological Studies (MATS), Master of Arts in Pastoral Studies (MAPS), Master of Theology (ThM), and Master of Reformed Baptist Studies (MARBS) degrees.

== Accreditation ==
CBTS is accredited by the Association of Reformed Theological Seminaries. ARTS received recognition as an accreditor from the Council on Higher Education Accreditation in May 2024.

== Non-profit status ==
According to Charity Navigator, "Covenant Baptist Theological Seminary is a 501(c)(3) organization, with an IRS ruling year of 2020".
