= Affinity (Christian organisation) =

Affinity is a network of conservative evangelical churches and Christian agencies throughout Britain and Ireland.

It was founded in 1953 as the British Evangelical Council and in 1981 numbered over 2,000 churches. The organization stagnated in the 1980s following the death of Martyn Lloyd-Jones. The rebranding and relaunch happened in 2004. Affinity provides networking and support to conservative evangelical churches in the United Kingdom and Ireland. There are currently about 1300 church congregations linked to Affinity. The organisation's subtitle is "Church-centred Partnership for Bible-centred Christianity".

The British Evangelical Council focussed, in reaction to the 1967 Keele University conference, "to draw in churches predicated on Scriptural ecumenicity." It was opposed to the World Council of Churches.

Groups of churches linked to Affinity include the Apostolic Church, the Association of Grace Baptist Churches (South East), the Evangelical Movement of Wales, the Fellowship of Independent Evangelical Churches, the Free Church of Scotland, the Free Church of Scotland (Continuing), the Evangelical Fellowship of Congregational Churches, the Evangelical Presbyterian Church in England and Wales and Ireland and the Evangelical Connexion of the Free Church of England.

Since 2016, its director has been Graham Nicholls, who is also pastor of Christ Church Haywards Heath.

== See also ==
- Conservative evangelicalism in the United Kingdom
