= Paul Washer =

American missionary

Paul David Washer
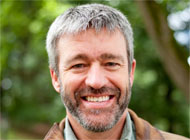
- Born: September 11, 1961 (age 65); Brookport, Illinois, U.S.
- Occupations: Missionary, Evangelist, Preacher
- Spouse: Rosario "Charo" Washer
- Children: 4

Paul David Washer (born September 11, 1961) is an American Christian Evangelist and author. He is from the Reformed Baptist tradition.

== Biography ==
Washer reports converting to Christianity while studying at the University of Texas at Austin to become an oil and gas lawyer. He moved to Peru and served there as a missionary for 10 years. In 1988, while in Peru, Washer founded the HeartCry Missionary Society to support indigenous missionaries witnessing to people of their own cultures. As of 2017, the organization supported 238 missionary families in 41 countries. At the end of 2022, it supported 326 missionary families in 62 countries.

Washer later returned to the United States. In 2010, he moved to Radford, Virginia, and he now resides in Roanoke, Virginia, where he is currently the executive director of HeartCry. HeartCry's offices have been based in Roanoke since 2022.

Washer is sometimes identified as part of the New Calvinism movement, although he has expressed concerns with this movement.

In 2002, Washer preached a "shocking youth message" in which he suggested that most of his "Christian" audience will end up in hell because of the false gospel they are deceiving themselves with. As of 2023, the YouTube video of the talk has received more than 4 million views. Washer appeared in the 2018 documentary American Gospel: Christ Alone, in which he said, "In other religions, you get to heaven by being good, by earning it..."

In 2017, Washer suffered a heart attack and in 2023 he received heart bypass surgery.

== Books ==
- — (2004). The one true God. HeartCry Missionary Society. ISBN 978-0-9770234-0-0.
- — (October 9, 2009). The truth about man (2nd ed.). Hannibal, Missouri: Granted Ministries Press. ISBN 978-0-9817321-1-4.
- — (2012). The gospel's power and message. Recovering the gospel. Vol. 1. Grand Rapids, Michigan: Reformation Heritage Books. ISBN 978-1-60178-195-6.
- — (2013). The gospel call and true conversion. Recovering the gospel. Vol. 2. Grand Rapids, Michigan: Reformation Heritage Books. ISBN 978-1-60178-236-6.
- — (2014). Gospel assurance and warnings. Recovering the gospel. Vol. 3. Grand Rapids, Michigan: Reformation Heritage Books. ISBN 978-1-60178-294-6.
- — (2016). Knowing the living God. Biblical foundations for the Christian faith. Vol. 1. New Albany, Mississippi: Media Gratiae. ISBN 978-0-9886681-3-3. OCLC 959927375.
- — (August 21, 2016). Discovering the glorious gospel. Biblical foundations for the Christian faith. Vol. 2. New Albany, Mississippi: Media Gratiae. ISBN 978-0-9886681-5-7. OCLC 959928019.
- — (December 15, 2016). The gospel of Jesus Christ. Grand Rapids, Michigan: Reformation Heritage Books. ISBN 978-1-60178-520-6.
- — (2017). Discerning the plight of man. Biblical foundations for the Christian faith. Vol. 3. New Albany, Mississippi: Media Gratiae. ISBN 978-0-9886681-6-4.
- — (June 30, 2018). Narrow gate, narrow way. Grand Rapids, Michigan: Reformation Heritage Books. ISBN 978-1-60178-629-6.
- — (August 15, 2018). Ten indictments against the modern church. Grand Rapids, Michigan: Reformation Heritage Books. ISBN 978-1-60178-628-9. ISBN 978-1-60178-627-2.
- — (March 13, 2020). Understanding the discipline of fasting. Biblical foundations for the Christian faith. Vol. 4. New Albany, Mississippi: Media Gratiae. ISBN 979-8-6242-0633-5.
- — (August 18, 2020). The essential means of grace. Grand Rapids, Michigan: Reformation Heritage Books. ISBN 978-1-60178-807-8. OCLC 1153337799.
- — (March 5, 2023). The preeminent Christ: God's beautiful and unchanging gospel. Grand Rapids, Michigan: Reformation Heritage Books. ISBN 978-1-60178-988-4. OCLC 1372277782.
