= Mary Porteous =

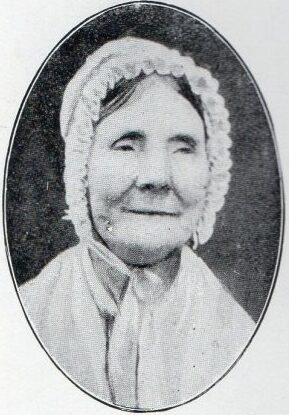
- Born: Mary Thompson; 1783; Newcastle upon Tyne, England
- Died: 18 April 1861 (aged 77–78); Durham, England
- Occupation: Preacher
- Known for: Preaching
- Spouse: Thomas Porteous

Mary Porteous born Mary Thompson (1783 – 18 April 1861) was a British Primitive Methodist itinerant preacher.

== Life ==
Porteous was born in Newcastle upon Tyne in 1783. Her mother is unknown, but her father Thomas was a cabinet maker, a strict Presbyterian. He died leaving a wife and a large family and Porteous was leaving school aged seven. She was a child factory worker who found enough time to teach herself how to read and how to write. She left that work when she was eleven due to her health and she would read while spinning yarn to make money.

She married a seaman named Thomas Porteous in 1803. At the time she was still attending Presbyterian services. She became more committed to the Primitive Methodists helping with classes, visiting and as a Sunday School teacher.

Porteous fell foul of a new Primitive Methodist rule in 1827 that stated that "no married female shall be allowed to labour as a travelling preacher in any circuit except that in which her husband resides". This meant that any woman preacher who married a man from outside her circuit had to give up that role.

Porteous however was considered to be an exceptional case and she was given special permission to continue despite the ruling. Porteous moved frequently from circuit to circuit. In 1828 she was in Ripon in Yorkshire and by 1830 she was on the circuit based in Carlisle. 1833 found her moved again to the Hexham circuit and then to North Shields in 1836. She wrote that the North Shield circuit caused her travel 682 miles and over 200 of these she had walked, begging for food and lodging and carrying her own luggage. The last two moves were to Sunderland in 1838 and Durham in 1839. Durham had worried her because she understood that she might have to preach in Scotland where she believed they would not tolerate a woman preacher. The loss of itinerant woman preachers was high. Over half of the women itinerant preachers had stopped their work by 1837. The job was difficult and when they married each other then the woman was frequently the one to care for the resulting children. Porteous suffered from rheumatism caused by her life and she stopped touring in 1840 and she settled down to work locally.

She continued to preach in Durham and Sunderland until in 1857 and 1859 she had strokes. Porteous died in 1861 in Durham.
