= Baptist Affirmation of Faith 1966 =

The Baptist Affirmation of Faith 1966 also known as the Strict Baptist Affirmation of Faith 1966, is essentially a confession of faith which was drawn up by the Strict Baptist Assembly in London on May 21, 1966. The Grace Baptist Assembly, which has succeeded the Strict Baptist Assembly, also commends this affirmation to the churches for their help and benefit.

The Strict Baptist churches (now the Grace Baptist churches) are churches that have largely stood in the Reformed Baptist tradition, many of whom hold to the historic confession the 1689 Baptist Confession of Faith. However, they would also hold to the practice of strict communion, which is more explicitly mentioned in the 1966 Affirmation.

This Affirmation of Faith can be read on the Grace Baptist Assembly website.
