= Owen Strachan =

American theologian

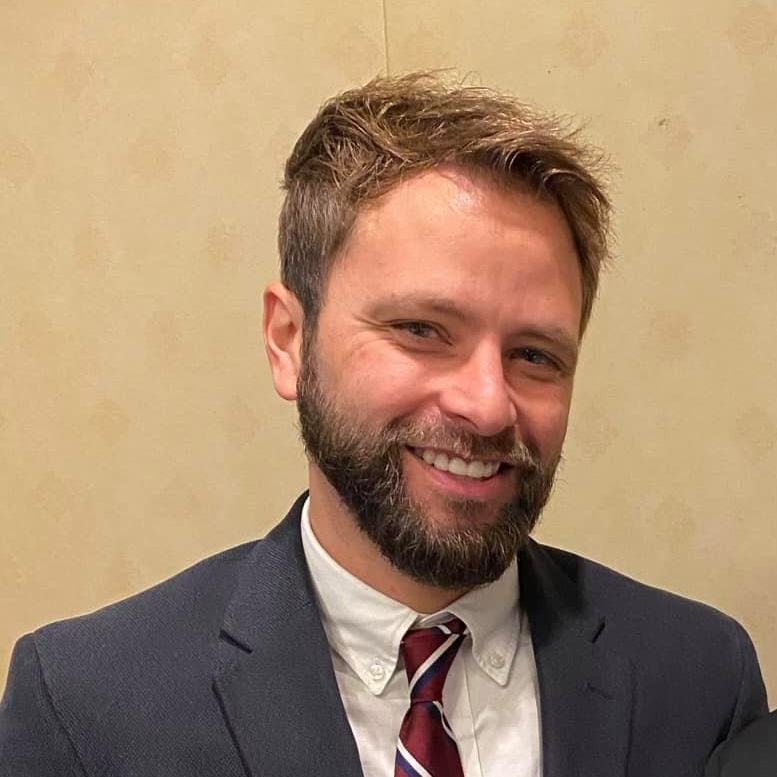
- Born: Owen D. Strachan; May 14, 1981 (age 45); Maine, U.S.
- Occupations: Pastor, author, theologian
- Spouse: Bethany Strachan
- Writing career
- Genres: Theology, culture
- Website: owenstrachan.wordpress.com

Owen Strachan (pronounced "Stran") is an American Calvinist theologian. He is provost of Grace Bible Theological Seminary in Arkansas and became the Senior Director of the Dobson Culture Center in June 2024.

Strachan studied at Bowdoin College, Southern Baptist Theological Seminary, and Trinity Evangelical Divinity School. He previously taught at Midwestern Baptist Theological Seminary and served as president of the Council on Biblical Manhood and Womanhood from 2014 to 2016.

Strachan is a critic of both wokeness and Christian nationalism. His podcast "Grace and Truth with Owen Strachan" is hosted by the Salem Podcast Network. Mark Wingfield, writing for Baptist News Global in 2022, suggested that Strachan "remains an influential person among the right-most flank of the SBC."
