= Ivor Powell (evangelist) =

Welsh evangelist (1910–1998)

Ivor Powell (22 April 1910 – 26 October 1998) was a Welsh evangelist and author.

Powell was born in Crosskeys. He studied at the South Wales Bible Training Institute was ordained as a minister of the Baptist Union of Wales in 1934. He began his pastoral ministry in Barry, Glamorganshire and also served as a traveling evangelist, visiting many countries. He was in Australia from 1951 to 1954, conducting crusades in every state. He was known as "The Man from Wales."

Powell wrote a number of books, including John's Wonderful Gospel (1983), Luke’s Thrilling Gospel (1984), Mark's Superb Gospel (1985), Matthew's Majestic Gospel (1987), The Amazing Acts (1987), and Heaven: My Father's Country (1995).

He received an honorary Doctor of Divinity degree from Trinity College of Florida in 1971.
