= Reformation Today =

Christian magazine

- Cover of the March/April 2016 issue
- Editor: Kees van Kralingen
- Frequency: Quarterly
- Founder: Erroll Hulse
- First issue: 1970
- Company: Reformation Today Trust
- Country: United Kingdom
- Based in: Leeds
- Language: English
- Website: reformation-today.org

Reformation Today is a Christian magazine. It was founded by Erroll Hulse in 1970, who served as editor until 2013. The current editor is Kees van Kralingen.

Curt Daniel describes RT as "the unofficial organ of the Reformed Baptists." Tim Grass notes that "compared with most Strict Baptist productions, especially pre-1970, Reformation Today is noticeably more concerned to engage with contemporary social and intellectual trends, as well as offering considerably more demanding articles, historical, ecclesiological and doctrinal."

Reformation Today used to be published bimonthly, but is now published quarterly.
