= Italian Evangelical Alliance =

Italian evangelical Christian organisation

- Founded: 1974
- Type: Evangelical organization
- Purpose: Evangelical Christianity
- Headquarters: Rome, Italy
- Location: Italy
- Website: www.alleanzaevangelica.org

The Italian Evangelical Alliance (Italian: Alleanza evangelica italiana, AEI) is a national evangelical alliance in Italy and member of the World Evangelical Alliance.

== History ==
Italian Evangelical Alliance was founded in Florence in 1974 as a response to the European Congress on Evangelization (Amsterdam 1971) and the Lausanne gathering in 1974. It is now based in Rome.
