= Grace Baptist School (Portland, Maine) =

Location
- 476 Summit Street; Portland, Cumberland, Maine 04103-1619; United States; 43°43′5″N 70°17′45″W

Information
- School type: parochial school private
- Religious affiliation: Independent Fundamentalist Baptist
- Denomination: Baptist
- Established: 1976
- Founder: Dr. Harry Boyle
- Closed: 2013
- Staff: 17
- Grades: K–12
- Athletics: cross country, volleyball, basketball
- Mascot: Lion
- Team name: Lions
- Pastor: Harry Boyle
- SIC: Religious Organizations
- DBA: Grace Baptist School; Grace Baptist Church
- Website: web.archive.org/web/20090305075726/http://www.gbc.to/school (archived 2009)

Grace Baptist School was a Baptist Christian school located in Portland, Maine, USA. Grace Baptist educated students in grades K-12. It closed in 2013 due to lack of funds.

== History ==
Grace Baptist School, serving grades K–12, was established 1976, when the church build the Family Life Center, including classrooms, a kitchen, and a gymnasium. In 1979, Alpha Omega Publications invited Rev. Harry Boyle, and two Grace Baptist teachers, Mrs. Ryland Burns and Eric Strange. "to assist in an in-depth review of its new curriculum".

By 1980, K–12 attendance was approximately 100 students. The following year, enrollment was up to 110 students, according to Principal Eugene St. Clair, and the school employed 10 full and part-time teachers. In 1982, the "Christ-centered curriculum" was provided by the Alpha Omega text series, and the school only accepted "children of Grace Baptist members or members of other independent Baptist churches in the area without schools of their own".

The school closed in 2013.
