= Thomas Ascol =

American pastor

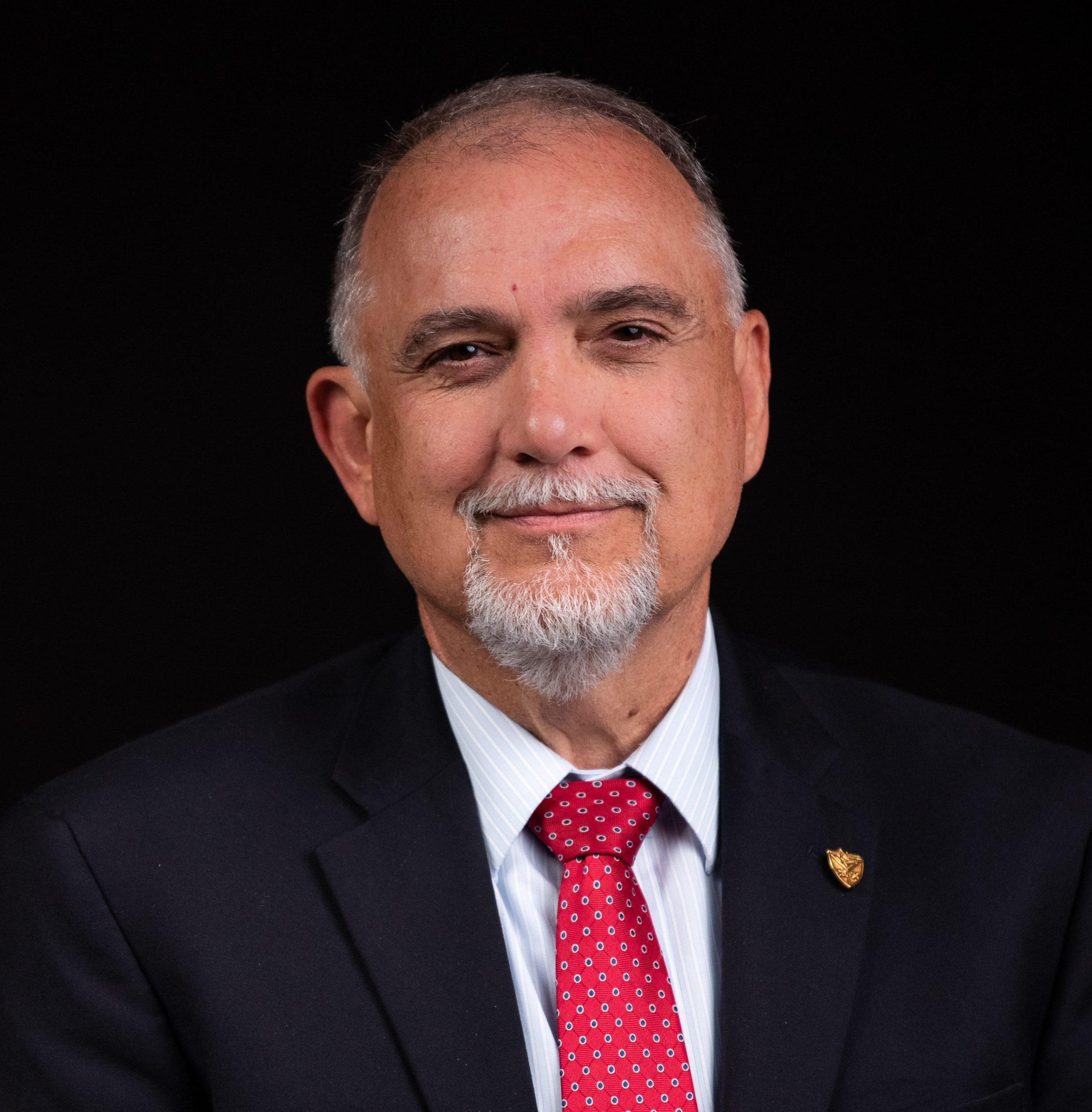
- Born: Thomas Kennedy Ascol; Beaumont, Texas, United States
- Occupations: pastor, author, theologian
- Spouse: Donna
- Children: 6
- Writing career
- Pen name: Tom Ascol
- Genres: Theology, Culture
- Website: www.founders.org

Thomas Kennedy Ascol is an evangelical Christian pastor, author, and president of Founders Ministries. He is the founding Editor of the Founders Journal, President of the Institute of Public Theology, founding Chancellor of Founders Seminary, as well as the senior pastor of Grace Baptist Church in Cape Coral, Florida, where he has served since June 1, 1986.

== Biography ==
Tom Ascol was born in Beaumont, Texas to Adella Abraham and Marzelle Ascol. He is the youngest of six children. His mother was born in Arkansas to strict Baptist parents. His father was born to a Muslim immigrant from Syria. He and his siblings were brought up under the godly influence of their mother and each professed faith in Jesus Christ and followed him from early ages.

Ascol began serving as pastor of Grace Baptist Church in Cape Coral, Florida 1986 when he moved with is wife, Donna, and two oldest children from Ft. Worth, Texas. Prior to this move he served as a pastor and associate pastor of two churches in Texas. He has a B.S. from Texas A&M University (1979), a M.Div and Ph.D from Southwestern Baptist Theological Seminary in Ft. Worth, Texas. He has served as an adjunct professor of theology for various colleges and seminaries, including Reformed Theological Seminary, the Covenant Baptist Theological Seminary (which he helped establish), African Christian University, Copperbelt Ministerial College, and Reformed Baptist Seminary. He has also served as a visiting professor at the Nicole Institute for Baptist Studies at Reformed Theological Seminary in Orlando, Florida.

Ascol is the president of Founders Ministries and the Institute of Public Theology as well as President of Founders Seminary. He is the founding editor of the Founders Journal (now edited by Tom Nettles), and has been a regular contributor to TableTalk, the monthly magazine of Ligonier Ministries. He has published hundreds of articles in dozens of journals and periodicals around the world. Ascol regularly preaches and lectures at various conferences throughout the United States and other countries, and hosts a weekly podcast called The Sword & The Trowel.

== Involvement in public theology ==
=== Position on abortion ===
Ascol believes that abortion is homicide, and is in favor of equal protection under the law for unborn children.

=== Position church and state ===
He believes in a proper understanding of the separation of church and state but does not believe in the separation of God and state. He believes that all civil magistrates are appointed by Jesus Christ and are obligated to Him to exercise the authority He has entrusted to them in accordance with His will. Ascol stakes his views on these matters on Bible passages such as Genesis 1:1, Matthew 28:18-20, Romans 13:1-7, and 1 Peter 2:13-17.

=== Resolutions at the Southern Baptist Convention ===
After years of being rebuffed by leaders and messengers in the Southern Baptist Convention, in June 2008, Ascol was successful in spearheading Resolution No. 6 "On Regenerate Church Membership and Church Member Restoration" and an accompanying amendment that encouraged Southern Baptist Convention churches to repent for failing to maintain biblical standards in the membership of their churches and obey Jesus Christ in the practice of lovingly correcting wayward church members.

In 2019, Ascol offered an amendment to Resolution No. 9 “On Critical Race Theory and Intersectionality” arguing that the amendment would strengthen the resolution by acknowledging the roots of these ideologies and making it more explicitly theological. The amendment failed in a split vote and the controversial resolution was adopted. Ascol and the staff of Founders Ministries went on to produce a groundbreaking documentary on the infiltration of critical theories and Marxism into the Southern Baptist Convention and other evangelical institutions. Despite massive opposition and attempts to cancel the project, By What Standard, God's World...God's Rules, debuted December 6, 2019. Within weeks it was viewed by 100,000s of people around the world.

In 2021, Ascol joined with others in submitting a new resolution, “On CRT/I Being Incompatible with the Baptist Faith and Message;” however, the committee on resolutions declined to bring the new resolution to the convention floor despite its being signed and submitted by more than 1300 Southern Baptists. After the resolutions committee declined to bring the new resolution, Ascol led an attempt to rescind Resolution 9, adopted in the 2019 convention. That motion was ruled out of order by President J. D. Greear and the convention did not get to vote on it.

=== National involvement ===
Ascol was a primary drafter of the 2018 Dallas Statement on Social Justice and the Gospel, a statement of 14 resolutions and denials on topics like the church, sexuality and marriage, and racism. The statement was publicly released on September 4, 2018, and has garnered more than 17,000 signers worldwide.

In 2019, Ascol was asked to speak at the annual Conservative Political Action Conference (CPAC) held in Oxon Hill, Maryland where he spoke on the "progressive ideological challenges" to Biblical Christianity. Upon his reelection as Governor of Florida, Ron DeSantis asked Dr. Ascol to pray at his inauguration in Tallahassee.

=== Founders ministries ===
Begun in 1982, Founders Ministries exists for the recovery of the Gospel and the reformation of local churches. Ascol serves as president of the organization and is a regular contributor both in the quarterly academic publication, The Founders Journal and the Founders Ministry Blog. Ascol also co-hosts a weekly podcast, The Sword & The Trowel, which currently has over 200 episodes and 4.8 stars out of over 600 ratings. The podcast regularly engages with issues at the intersection of culture, politics, and theology.

=== Institute of public theology and Founders Seminary ===
In 2021, Founders Ministries opened the Institute of Public Theology, with Ascol as the founding president. Ascol taught the inaugural course, “The Pastor in the Public Square,” in the Fall 2021 semester. IOPT graduated their first students in September 2024. With the announcement of Founders Seminary IOPT has now become a four-year college with majors in Public Theology, Classical Christian Education, and Business.

During the national Founders Conference in January 2025, Dr. Ascol announced the inauguration of Founders Seminary with classes scheduled to begin in August 2025. Joining him as inaugural residential faculty are Voddie Baucham, and Peter Sammons. Other non-residential faculty include Tom Nettles, Conrad Mbewe, and Travis Allen. "Sharp Minds. Warm Hearts. Steel Spines." Helping churches develop qualified men with such attributes is the goal of the seminary. Every faculty member will not only be confessionally convicted, ecclesiologically grounded, and apologetically aware, but will also be men of proven character. They will be men who have blood mixed with their convictions.

Upon the death of Dr. Baucham, September 25, 2025, Dr. Ascol was named by the board of Founders Ministries as the acting president of the seminary. On March 25, 2026, the board elected Dr. Ascol as president of the seminary.

== Personal life ==
Ascol and his wife Donna have six children, four sons-in-law, one daughter-in-law, and 23 (and counting) grandchildren, all of whom live in Cape Coral and are faithful in Grace Baptist Church.

== Publications ==
- Founders Journal (Editor)
- Amazing Grace: The History and Theology of Calvinism (Documentary | Contributor)
- Sword and Trowel (Podcast)
- By What Standard? God’s World… God’s Rules (Cinedoc | Producer)
- Wield the Sword (Docuseries | Producer)
- Ministry By His Grace and For His Glory (Editor)
- Reclaiming the Gospel and Reforming Churches (Editor)
- Truth and Grace Memory Book 1 (Author)
- Truth and Grace Memory Book 2 (Author)
- Truth and Grace Memory Book 3 (Author)
- From the Protestant Reformation to the SBC (Author)
- Dear Timothy: Letters on Pastoral Ministry (Editor)
- Traditional Theology and the SBC (Author)
- Strong and Courageous: Following Jesus Amid the Rise of America's New Religion (Co-author)
- Suffering with Joy (Author)
- As the Darkness Clears Away (Author)
- The Perils and Promises of Christian Nationalism (Author)
- Regenerate Church Membership (Author)
- The Necessity of Accommodation and the Danger of Compromise (Author)
- Imputation: The Sinner's Only Hope (Author)
- Calvinism Foundation for Evangelism and Missions (Author)
- From the Realms of Endless Day (Author)
- Real Life in a Fallen World (Author)
