= Grace Baptist Association =

Church organization in South East England

- Formation: 1871 (as Metropolitan Association of Strict Baptist Churches (M.A.S.B.C.))
- Type: Calvinistic Baptist
- Legal status: Registered charity
- Headquarters: London
- Location: 62 Bride Street, London N7 8AZ, United Kingdom
- Region served: Southern England
- Association Secretary: Andrew King
- Website: www.gracebaptists.org

The Grace Baptist Association is an association of churches in southern England. Until 2025 it was called the Association of Grace Baptist Churches (South East) but was renamed with the addition of churches in both West Anglia and East Anglia.

As of 2025 there are 99 member churches in the association plus 1 church plant. All the members of the association are independent Baptist churches of a reformed, evangelical persuasion.

The association is a registered charity and is a corporate partner of Affinity. As part of its work, it provides advice and support for its members. It is also involved in lobbying the government on issues important to its members, through its membership of Churches' Legislation Advisory Service (CLAS).

== History ==
The Association was established in 1871 as the Metropolitan Association of Strict Baptist Churches (MASBC), an association of 23 Strict Baptist churches. John Stevens, a Baptist minister in London, was noted for his influence in the formation of the association, which was motivated by concern to maintain clear Calvinist doctrines.

The name "Strict" represented the position that the churches had on a strict or closed communion (also known at the Lord's Table), whereby the churches required all those taking part in this ordinance to be baptised by immersion. The name "Strict" was, however, often misunderstood and gave the wrong impression to those outside of the churches, and so they later became known as "Grace Baptist" churches. This was reflected in the association's change of name to the current form.

== See also ==
- Grace Baptist
- List of Strict Baptist churches
