= Voddie Baucham =

American pastor, author and educator (1969–2025)

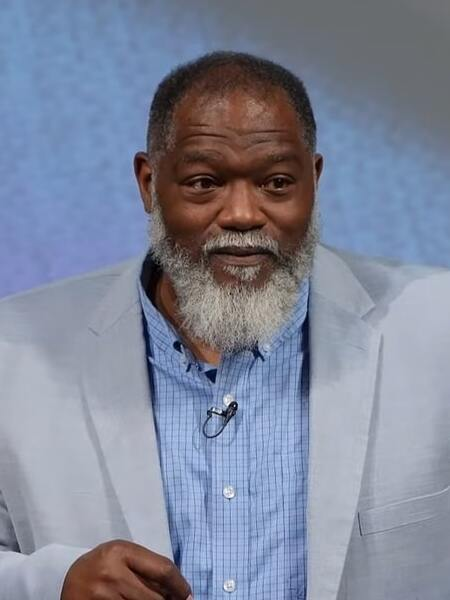
- Baucham in 2025

Personal life
- Born: Voddie Tharon Baucham, Jr. March 11, 1969 Los Angeles, California, U.S.
- Died: September 25, 2025 (aged 56) Dallas, Texas, U.S.
- Spouse: Bridget Linette Baucham (née Wilson)
- Children: 9
- Education: Houston Baptist University (B.A.); Southwestern Baptist Theological Seminary (M.Div.); Southeastern Baptist Theological Seminary (D.Min.)
- Known for: Christian ministry and apologetics

Religious life
- Religion: Christianity
- Denomination: Reformed Baptist

Voddie Tharon Baucham, Jr. (March 11, 1969 – September 25, 2025) was an American Reformed Baptist pastor, author, and educator. He served as Dean of Theology for nine years, from 2015 to 2024, at African Christian University in Lusaka, Zambia.

Baucham was the founding president of Founders Seminary in Cape Coral, Florida, in January 2025.

== Biography ==
Baucham was born in Los Angeles in 1969. His mother, Frances, was a teenager at the time, and his father left the family not long after his birth. Voddie grew up in Los Angeles with his Zen Buddhist mother, but the two moved to South Carolina when he was twelve to live with an uncle who was a Vietnam War veteran. Baucham then attended a Texas high school with the dream of attending the United States Air Force Academy.

Instead of studying at the Air Force Academy, Baucham studied at New Mexico State University for the 1986-1987 school year, playing football as a tight end. While there, he learned about Christianity and eventually converted. He transferred to Rice University for his sophomore year and continued playing football there. During this time, he also began preaching and was ordained as a Baptist minister. After completing his sophomore year, he married Bridget Wilson and started having children shortly thereafter. He later transferred to Houston Baptist University, where he graduated with a B.A. He went on to earn an M.Div. from Southwestern Baptist Theological Seminary and a D.Min. from Southeastern Baptist Theological Seminary. Baucham also pursued post-graduate study at the University of Oxford. He founded Voddie Baucham Ministries in 1993.

Baucham was active in itinerant preaching for many years, primarily in Texas, and spoke at some of the early Passion Conferences in the late 1990s. He later served as pastor of Grace Family Baptist Church in Spring, Texas, (a congregation within the Southern Baptist Convention) until moving to Zambia in 2015. He was a board member of Founders Ministries.

In February 2021, Baucham experienced heart failure and had to travel to the Mayo Clinic Florida for treatment. A GoFundMe campaign for his medical expenses raised more than a million dollars.

In March 2022, Baucham confirmed that he had been asked to accept a nomination for president of the Southern Baptist Convention, though he noted that, as an overseas missionary, he was unsure of his eligibility. He also received the 2022 Boniface Award from the Association of Classical Christian Schools, given to recognize "a public figure who has stood faithfully for Christian truth, beauty, and goodness with grace." In 2024, he moved back from Zambia to the United States. In January 2025, it was announced that he would be one of the founding faculty of Founders Seminary in Florida. Baucham remained in the position until his death in September 2025.

He and his wife Bridget had nine children. He was a practitioner of Brazilian jiu-jitsu. Baucham died on September 25, 2025, at the age of 56, after suffering an emergency medical incident.

== Beliefs ==
=== Theology ===
Baucham was Reformed in his theology, and subscribed to the 1689 Baptist Confession of Faith. He called himself a "fire-breathing, TULIP believing, five point Calvinist." Baucham appeared in the 2019 documentary American Gospel: Christ Crucified speaking in favor of penal substitutionary atonement. His statement "God killed Jesus" was criticized for "muddying the waters" on this doctrine.

=== Biblical patriarchy ===
Baucham was an adherent of biblical patriarchy. He outlined his views on the subject in his 2009 book What He Must Be: ...If He Wants to Marry My Daughter, though preferring the phrase "gospel patriarchy". Baucham criticized Sarah Palin's vice presidential candidacy in 2008, on the basis that women serve best at home.

Baucham was also a supporter of the stay-at-home daughter movement. He appeared in Vision Forum's 2007 documentary Return of the Daughters, in which he said that America is suffering an "epidemic of unprotected women."

=== Family and church ===
Baucham and his wife homeschooled their children, and he spoke against Christians sending their children to public schools. In his 2007 book, Family Driven Faith: Doing What It Takes to Raise Sons and Daughters Who Walk with God, Baucham argued that parents (especially fathers) can and should disciple their children through family worship and through attending family integrated churches.

=== Critical race theory ===
Baucham rejected critical race theory in favor of what he called "biblical justice", and saw it as a religious movement, with its own cosmology, saints, liturgy, and law. Baucham's 2021 book Fault Lines: The Social Justice Movement and Evangelicalism's Looming Catastrophe outlined his criticisms of the movement. In Fault Lines he argued that Critical Theory and its subsets, Critical Race Theory-Intersectionality and Critical Social Justice are grounded in Western Marxism, the public social justice conversation is perpetuating misinformation, and is incompatible with Christianity as a competing worldview. In August 2021, Baucham was accused of plagiarizing parts of the book and falsifying a quote he attributed to Richard Delgado, an early researcher of critical race theory. The publisher, Salem Books, rejected the plagiarism claim, saying it was merely a matter of style, while Delgado denied making such a quotation.

=== Biblical apologetics ===
Baucham's sermons and book, The Ever-Loving Truth: Can Faith Thrive in a Post-Christian Culture? advocate that Christians defend belief in the Bible with reasoned arguments rather than tradition or personal experience. Baucham promoted a specific argument for biblical belief resting on five claims:

1. The Bible is a reliable collection of historical documents
2. The Bible was written by eyewitnesses
3. The Bible was written during the lifetime of other eyewitnesses
4. The eyewitnesses report supernatural events that took place in fulfillment of specific prophecies
5. The eyewitnesses claim that their writings were divine rather than human in origin

== Books ==
- The Ever-Loving Truth: Can Faith Thrive in a Post-Christian Culture? (Broadman & Holman, 2004) ISBN 978-1-68451-504-2
- Family Driven Faith: Doing What It Takes to Raise Sons and Daughters Who Walk with God (Crossway, 2007) ISBN 978-1-4335-2833-0
- What He Must Be: ...If He Wants to Marry My Daughter (Crossway, 2009) ISBN 978-1-5459-0549-4
- Family Shepherds: Calling and Equipping Men to Lead Their Homes (Crossway, 2011) ISBN 978-1-64689-225-9
- Joseph And the Gospel of Many Colors: Reading an Old Story in a New Way (Crossway, 2013) ISBN 978-1-4335-2374-8
- Expository Apologetics: Answering Objections with the Power of the Word (Crossway, 2015) ISBN 978-1-4335-3382-2
- Fault Lines: The Social Justice Movement and Evangelicalism's Looming Catastrophe (Salem Books, 2021) ISBN 978-1-68451-180-8
- It’s Not Like Being Black: How Sexual Activists Hijacked the Civil Rights Movement (Regnery Faith, 2024) ISBN 978-1-68451-364-2
