= Itinerant preacher =

Travelling Christian evangelist who preaches the redemption message

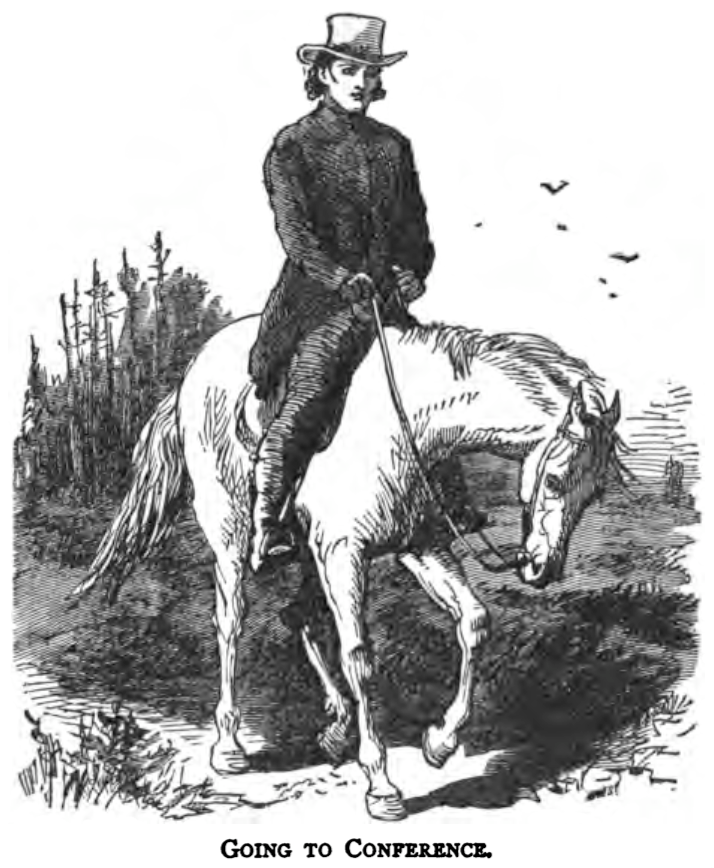
Illustration from The Circuit Rider: A Tale of the Heroic Age by Edward Eggleston depicting a Methodist circuit rider on horseback

An itinerant preacher (also known as an itinerant minister) is a Christian evangelist who preaches the basic Christian redemption message while traveling around to different groups of people within a relatively short period of time. The usage of these travelling evangelists is known as itineracy or itinerancy.

== History ==
Early first century New Testament figures such as John the Baptist, Jesus Christ and Apostle Paul were known for traveling extensively and preaching to unreached people groups in the Middle East and Europe, although they often stayed for longer periods than modern itinerant evangelists. In the Middle Ages, preachers from the mendicant orders such as Franciscans and Dominicans, would likewise travel from town to town to preach repentance or to combat heresy.

Starting in the eighteenth century, the Methodists were known for their itinerant preachers, known as circuit riders, to share the message. Among the most noted would be George Whitefield, who drew huge crowds as he traveled about colonial America during the 18th century The unusual and unconventional methods employed by the Methodists often resulted in compounding the existing rift between Anglicanism and Methodism. The "Itinerancy" is denoted as one of the "chief peculiar usages" of classic Methodism, along with practices such as class meetings and watchnight services.

Mary Porteous was a Primitive Methodist itinereant preacher. She was given permission to ignore the rules that applied to women itinerant preachers. She wrote about her time on the North Shields circuit in 1836. She travelled 682 miles, over 200 of which were on foot, begging for food and lodging and carrying her own luggage.

The Quakers referred to their itinerant preachers as "public friends".

== Modern itinerancy ==
In the Methodist Church of Great Britain, ministerial appointments last for several years and may be extended. A process known as "stationing" enables churches and circuits to identify the type of minister they would propose to invite to serve them and ministers to put forward their offer to serve: the stationing process then matches these and the appointments are confirmed by the Annual Conference.

Appointments in the United Methodist Church now last for one year.

== See also ==
- Mendicant
