= Founders Ministries =

Reformed Baptist group within the Southern Baptist Convention

- Formation: November 13, 1982
- Headquarters: Cape Coral, Florida
- Executive Director: Thomas Ascol
- Website: founders.org
- Formerly called: Southern Baptist Founders Conference

Founders Ministries, previously known as the Southern Baptist Founders Conference, is a Reformed Baptist group within the Southern Baptist Convention in the United States. Its goal is to return Southern Baptists to what it considers their Calvinist roots, and it has contributed to the Southern Baptist Convention conservative resurgence. The executive director is Thomas Ascol.

The Southern Baptist Founders Conference was established in 1982, holding its first annual conference in 1983. The organization which developed was renamed Founders Ministries in 1998. As of 2007, there were 807 subscribing congregations in the United States.

According to Nathan Finn, non-Calvinists within the Southern Baptist Convention "seem to be especially concerned with the influence of Founders Ministries." Critics argue that Southern Baptists have never been Calvinistic. Tom Ascol, executive director of Founders Ministries, stated a majority of the founders of the Southern Baptist Convention in 1845 held to the doctrines of grace.

Founders Ministries has operated Founders Press since 1983, and publishes Founders Journal, a quarterly journal established in 1990.

In December 2020, Founders Ministries established the Institute of Public Theology, which has undergraduate and certificate programs. In January 2025, Founders Ministries established Founders Seminary, a residential seminary in Cape Coral, Florida. Ascol, Voddie Baucham, and Tom Nettles were the founding faculty.
