= Reformed Baptists =

Calvinist strand of the Baptist denomination

Reformed Baptists, also called Particular Baptists, or Calvinistic Baptists, are Baptists that hold to a Reformed soteriology (i.e., understanding of the mechanics of salvation). The name "Reformed Baptist" dates back to the latter part of the 20th century, to denote Baptists with a distinct form of covenant theology. Calvinistic Baptists adhere to varying degrees of Reformed theology, ranging from simply embracing the Five Points of Calvinism, to accepting Baptist covenant theology; all Reformed Baptists reject the classical Reformed (Presbyterian, Congregational, etc.) teaching on infant baptism, meaning that they reject infants as the proper subjects of baptism. The first Calvinistic Baptist church was formed in the late 1630s. Reformed Baptists are distinguished from General Baptists, whose soteriology is Arminian.

Reformed Baptists have produced two major confessions of faith as summary of their beliefs: The First London Confession of Faith (1644) and the Second London Confession of Faith (1689). Benjamin Keach, John Gill and Charles Spurgeon were some of the most prominent theologians for the Calvinist Baptist strand in England.

== Reformed Baptist groups ==
=== Particular Baptists ===
Particular Baptists are a group that dissented from the Church of England in the 17th century and adopted credobaptism. They are the original Reformed Baptists, dating from the 1630s. Particular Baptists took their name from the doctrine of particular redemption, distinct from the older General Baptists strand. They adhere to a higher degree of Reformed theology than other Calvinist Baptist groups and usually subscribe to the Second London Confession of Faith of 1689.

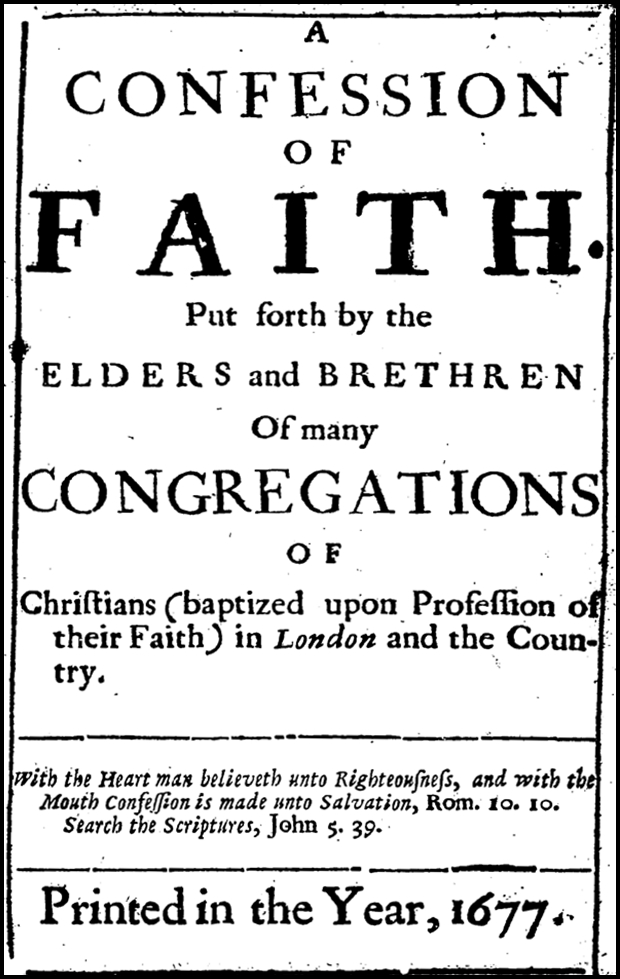
The cover page of the Second London Confession of Faith, the leading creedal statement of Reformed Baptist theology. Originally written in 1677, it was widely published with a new preface in 1689, and remains associated with that year.

Significant Reformed Baptist figures include John Bunyan, John Gill, and Charles Spurgeon. According, Reformed Baptists of this stamp are commonly called "1689 Baptists," and their distinctive covenant theology is known as "1689 federalism". In the last century, Particular Baptists became more popular as more Baptists identified with strong Puritan teachings.

=== Gospel Standard Baptists ===
Gospel Standard Baptists, also called Strict and Particular Baptists, are Particular Baptists that practice closed communion and generally prefer a more congregationalist polity, differentiating from other Reformed Baptist groups that share the same Calvinist soteriology. The Strict Baptists arose in England in the 18th century, led by the radical itinerant minister William Gadsby. Their religious beliefs continue in the Gospel Standard magazine and affiliated Church institution.

Grace Baptists are Strict Baptists who split from the Gospel Standard faith. The Baptist Affirmation of Faith 1966 is a confession of faith used by Grace Baptists.

=== Primitive Baptists ===
Primitive Baptists adhere to a Reformed soteriology. Primitive Baptists emphasize the teaching that "God alone is the author of salvation and therefore any effort by human beings to make salvation happen or compel others to conversion is simply a form of 'works righteousness' that implies that sinners can affect or effect their own salvation." As such, they have rejected the concept of missions.

=== Regular Baptists ===
Regular Baptists adhere to a Reformed soteriology. Those who are Old Regular Baptists largely hold to the tenets of Calvinism, "but maintain that God never predestined anyone to hell and that only those who do not heed the Word of God will be lost."

=== United Baptists ===
Certain denominations of United Baptists teach a Reformed soteriology.

=== Sovereign Grace Baptists ===
Sovereign Grace Baptists in the broadest sense are any "Calvinistic" Baptists that accept God's sovereign grace in salvation and predestination. In the narrower sense, certain churches and groups have preferred "Sovereign Grace" in their name, rather than using the terms "Calvinism", "Calvinist", or "Reformed Baptist". This includes some who prefer the 1644 Baptist Confession of Faith to the 1689 Confession, and who are critical of covenant theology.

All of these groups generally agree with the Five Points of Calvinism – Total Depravity, Unconditional Election, Limited Atonement, Irresistible Grace, and Perseverance of the Saints. Groups calling themselves "Sovereign Grace Baptists" have been particularly influenced by the writings of John Gill in the 18th century. Among American Baptists who have revived such Calvinist ideas were Rolfe P. Barnard and Henry T. Mahan, who organised the first Sovereign Grace Bible Conference in Ashland, Kentucky, in 1954, though groups designated as Sovereign Grace are not necessarily connected to them.

Calvinistic Baptist groups presently using the term Sovereign Grace include the Sovereign Grace Baptist Association, the Sovereign Grace Fellowship of Canada, and some among the growing Calvinist strand of Independent Baptists, including several hundred Landmark Independent Baptist churches.

== By region ==
=== United Kingdom ===
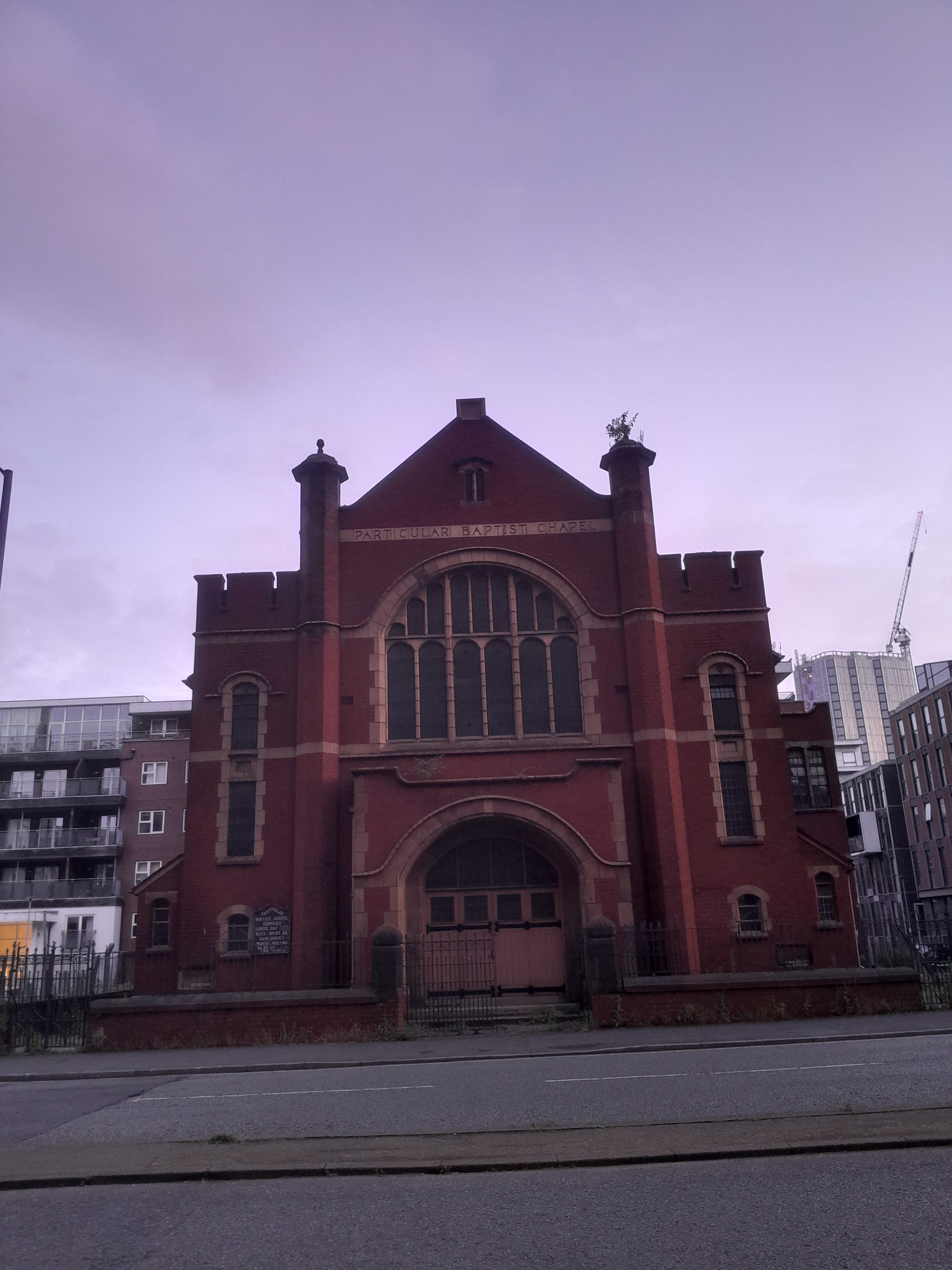
Particular Baptist Chapel in Manchester

Reformed Baptist churches in the UK go back to the 1630s. Notable early ministers include the author John Bunyan (1628–88), Benjamin Keach (1640–1704), the divine (theologian) John Gill (1697–1771), John Brine (1703–64), Andrew Fuller, and the missionary William Carey (1761–1834). Charles Spurgeon (1834–92), pastor to the New Park Street Chapel (later the Metropolitan Tabernacle) in London, has been called "by far the most famous and influential preacher the Baptists had." The Metropolitan Tabernacle Baptist Church itself has been particularly influential in the Reformed Baptist strand in the UK. Benjamin Keach, John Gill, John Rippon (1751–1836), Charles Spurgeon, and Peter Masters (mentioned below) have all pastored this same church. Their characteristic traits may be the founder (Keach, signer of the Second London), theologian (Gill), hymnist (Rippon), preacher (Spurgeon), and restorer (Masters).

The 1950s saw a renewed interest in Reformed theology among Baptists in the UK.

Peter Masters, pastor of the Metropolitan Tabernacle in London, created the London Reformed Baptist Seminary in 1975.

=== United States ===
Baptist churches in the United States continued to operate under the confessional statement, the Second London Confession, but they renamed it according to the local associations in which it was adopted, first the Philadelphia Confession (1742, which includes two new articles), then the Charleston Confession (1761, adopted from the London without changes). When the Southern Baptist Theological Seminary was founded, its governing confession, the abstract of principles, was summarized form of the Second London Confession, and its founding president, James P. Boyce wrote his "Abstract of Systematic Theology" from an evident Calvinist position. The first major shift at the seminary away from Calvinism came at the leadership of E. Y. Mullins, president from 1899 to 1928. Many of the developments in the U.K. mentioned above during the 1950s and following also made an impact on Baptists in America, seen especially in the Founders Movement (which was connected to the so-called "Conservative Resurgence" in the SBC) and in the works of men such as Walter Chantry, Roger Nicole, and Ernest Reisinger.

In March 2009, noting the resurgence of Calvinism in the United States, Time listed several Baptists among current Calvinist leaders. Albert Mohler, president of the Southern Baptist Theological Seminary, is a strong advocate of Calvinism, although his stand has received opposition from inside the Southern Baptist Convention. John Piper, who was pastor at Bethlehem Baptist Church in Minneapolis for 33 years, is one of several Baptists who have written in support of Calvinism.

While the Southern Baptist Convention remains split on Calvinism, there are a number of explicitly Reformed Baptist groups in the United States, including the Confessional Baptist Association, the Continental Baptist Churches, the Sovereign Grace Baptist Association of Churches, and other Sovereign Grace Baptists. Such groups have had some theological influence from other Reformed denominations, such as the Orthodox Presbyterian Church. An example of this is the 1995 adaptation of the Orthodox Presbyterian Church's Trinity Hymnal which was published for Reformed Baptist churches in America as the Trinity Hymnal (Baptist Edition).

By 2000, Calvinist Baptist in the United States totaled about 16,000 people in 400 congregations.

Several Reformed Baptist Seminaries currently operate in the US; International Reformed Baptist Seminary (IRBS), Covenant Baptist Theological Seminary, Grace Bible Theological Seminary, & Reformed Baptist Seminary are four that each subscribe to the Second London Confession of Faith in some form.

==== Sovereign Grace Baptist Association of Churches ====
The Sovereign Grace Baptist Association of Churches (SGBA), which was organized in 1984, sponsors an annual national conference and churches cooperate in missions, publications, retreats, camps and other activities. The Missionary Committee serves under the Executive Committee to screen candidates and recommend them to the churches for support. They currently (2009) are supporting one missionary endeavour. The Publication Committee reviews and approves submissions, and supplies literature to the churches. Grace News is published quarterly. A Confession of Faith was adopted in 1991. Membership in the SGBA is open to any Baptist church subscribing to the Constitution and Articles of Faith. There are 12 member churches, half of which are located in Michigan. The association is recognised as an endorsing agent for United States military chaplains.

=== Africa ===
Notable Reformed Baptist figures in Africa include Conrad Mbewe in Zambia, who has been compared to Spurgeon; Kenneth Mbugua and John Musyimi of Emmanuel Baptist Church Nairobi, Kenya; Tonny Karwa of Grace Baptist Church-Kisumu, Kenya.

In South Africa, the Afrikaanse Baptiste Kerke's 34 churches follow Reformed doctrines, as opposed to the mainly English speaking Baptist Union of Southern Africa, which does not.

=== Europe ===
There is a small but growing network of Reformed Baptist churches in Europe. The Italian churches are organized in the Evangelical Reformed Baptist Churches in Italy association; several French speaking churches sprung from the work of English missionary Stuart Olyott at the Église réformée baptiste de Lausanne, VD, CH, started in the 1960s. There is a growing network of Reformed Baptist Churches in Ukraine. There are few small communities churches in Germany, where the largest is in Frankfurt am Main. In March 2023, a new national association of churches formed in the United Kingdom, organized as the "Association of Confessional Baptist Churches in the United Kingdom".

=== Brazil ===
In Brazil there is a modest association, the Comunhão Reformada Batista do Brasil (Baptist Reformed Communion of Brazil) sprung mostly from the work of US missionary Richard Denham at São José dos Campos, SP. As it did not correspond to expectations of dynamism and effectiveness, it is being supplanted by a newer Convention, the Convenção Batista Reformada do Brasil (Reformed Baptist Convention of Brazil).

=== Canada ===
==== Sovereign Grace Fellowship of Canada ====
The Sovereign Grace Fellowship of Canada (SGF) is a fellowship of Baptist churches in Canada holding to either the First London Confession of Faith or the Second London. SGF had 10 member churches when it was formally inaugurated, located in New Brunswick and Ontario. As of 2012, there were 14 churches, including the Jarvis Street Baptist Church in Toronto. SGF is one of the Baptist groups associated with the Toronto Baptist Seminary and Bible College.

== See also ==
- Baptist successionism
- Grace Baptist
- List of Baptist confessions of faith
- List of Reformed Baptist groups
- List of Reformed Baptists
- New Covenant theology

== Bibliography ==
- Brackney, William H (2009), Historical Dictionary of the Baptists (2nd ed.), Scarecrow Press, ISBN 978-0-8108-5622-6.
- Weaver, C Douglas (2008), In Search of the New Testament Church: The Baptist Story, Mercer University Press, ISBN 978-0-88146-105-3.
