= Confession of Faith (1689) =

Particular Baptist creedal statement of 1689

The Confession of Faith (1689), also known as the 1689 Baptist Confession of Faith, or the Second London Confession of Faith (2LCF), is a Particular Baptist confession of faith. It was written by English Baptists who subscribed to a Calvinistic soteriology as well as to a non-Westminsterian covenantal systematic theology. Because it was revised by the Philadelphia Baptist Association in the 18th century, it is also known as the Philadelphia Confession of Faith. The Philadelphia Confession, however, was a modification of the Second London Confession; it added an allowance for the singing of hymns, psalms, and spiritual songs in the Lord's Supper and made optional the laying on of hands after baptism (Confirmation).

== History ==
The Second London Confession of Faith was first published in London in 1677 under the title "A confession of Faith put forth by the Elders and Brethren of many Congregations of Christians, Baptized upon Profession of their Faith in London and the Country. With an Appendix concerning Baptism." It was a revision of the Savoy Declaration (1658) with modifications to reflect Baptist theology. Savoy is itself a Congregationalist revision of the Westminster Confession (1646). The Confession was published again, under the same title, in 1688 and 1689.

The Act of Toleration passed by the Parliament of England in 1689 enabled religious freedom and plurality to co-exist alongside the established churches in England and Scotland. In response to the Act, representatives from over 100 Baptist churches assembled in the City of London from 3–12 September of 1689 to discuss and endorse the 1677 document. Thus, despite the fact that the document was written in 1677, the official preface to the Confession has ensured that it would be known as the "1689 Baptist Confession of Faith."

== Contents ==
The Confession consists of 32 chapters, as well as an introduction and a list of signatories.

1. Of the Holy Scriptures
2. Of God and the Holy Trinity
3. Of God's Decree
4. Of Creation
5. Of Divine Providence
6. Of the Fall of Man, of Sin, and of the Punishment Thereof
7. Of God's Covenant
8. Of Christ the Mediator
9. Of Free Will
10. Of Effectual Calling
11. Of Justification
12. Of Adoption
13. Of Sanctification
14. Of Saving Faith
15. Of Repentance Unto Life and Salvation
16. Of Good Works
17. Of the Perseverance of the Saints
18. Of the Assurance of Grace and Salvation
19. Of the Law of God
20. Of the Gospel and the Extent of Grace
21. Of Christian Liberty and Liberty of Conscience
22. Of Religious Worship and the Sabbath Day
23. Of Lawful Oaths and Vows
24. Of the Civil Magistrate
25. Of Marriage
26. Of the Church
27. Of the Communion of Saints
28. Of Baptism and the Lord's Supper
29. Of Baptism
30. Of the Lord's Supper
31. Of the State of Man After Death, and of the Resurrection of the Dead
32. Of the Last Judgment

== Distinctives ==
- The law's continued value for Christians - while Christ "abrogated" the Levitical ceremonial laws, the Confession cites Christ to have "strengthened this obligation" to obey the "moral" law expressed in the Ten Commandments, which "for ever binds all."
- Forbids prayers for the dead, whether faithful or damned.
- Sabbatarianism - A weekly Sabbath day is prescribed and believed "to be continued to the end of the world”.
- Marriage is a monogamous heterosexual ordinance.
- Intermarriage - Christians ought not intermarry with other religions, nor with any who believe "damnable heresies," but are to marry "in the Lord," and thereby not be "unequally yoked."
- Two church offices - (1) elders (also called "bishops" or "pastors") and (2) deacons.
- Eternal torment.
- An open view on the millennium. The Confession does not espouse a particular view on the millennium (cf. chapter 32).

== Influences ==
Baptists were quick to develop churches in colonial America, and in 1707 the Philadelphia Baptist Association was formed. The Association formally adopted a revision of the 1689 Confession in 1742 after years of tacit endorsement by local churches and congregational members. With the addition of two articles (on the singing of psalms and the laying on of hands), it was entitled the Philadelphia Confession of Faith. Further Baptists Associations and Calvinistic Baptist churches formed in the mid-late 18th century adopted the Confession as "The Baptist Confession."

== Current usage ==
Baptist churches around the world continue to subscribe to the 1689 Second London Confession of Faith as the fullest statement of their beliefs. Many of these churches are listed in directories like the Reformed Wiki, the Farese Church Directory and the 1689 Church Directory.

== Modernizations ==
Efforts have been made in recent years to modernize the language of the 1689 Baptist Confession to make it more accessible to contemporary readers. Some approaches are rather free, such as SM Houghton's A Faith to Confess, while others, such as Jeremy Walker's Rooted and Grounded, are more conservative. Still others, like Stan Reeve's The 1689 Baptist Confession of Faith In Modern English lie somewhere between. A comparison from the first paragraph demonstrates this:

". . . which maketh the Holy Scriptures to be most necessary, those former ways of God's revealing His will unto His people being now ceased." (Banner of Truth, 1689)

"And as the manner in which God formerly revealed His will has long ceased, the Holy Scripture becomes absolutely essential to men." (A Faith to Confess, 1975)

"This means that the Holy Scriptures are most necessary, because God’s former ways of revealing his will to his people have now ended." (Rooted and Grounded, 2021)

"Therefore, the Holy Scriptures are absolutely necessary, because God's former ways of revealing His will to His people have now ceased." (The 1689 Baptist Confession of Faith in Modern English, 2017)

== Modern expositions ==
Several expositions of the Confession have been published in recent years.

A Modern Exposition of the 1689 Baptist Confession, by Samuel Waldron, first published in 1989, was one of the first influential expositions of the confession in recent years. It has remained an influential work ever since, going through several editions, revisions, and corrections. Since it was first published, Particular Baptist scholarship has matured in several respects, particularly regarding covenant theology. Nevertheless, it remains a respected source for understanding the theology of the 2LCF.

A New Exposition of the London Baptist Confession of Faith, edited by Rob Ventura, is a collection of essays written by various Particular Baptist pastors and scholars expounding upon the theology of the 2LCF.

To the Judicious and Impartial Reader, by James Renihan is part of a multi-volume series covering 17th century Particular Baptist documents. Renihan's work is much larger than that of Waldron or Ventura.
