= Henry Danvers (Baptist) =

English preacher

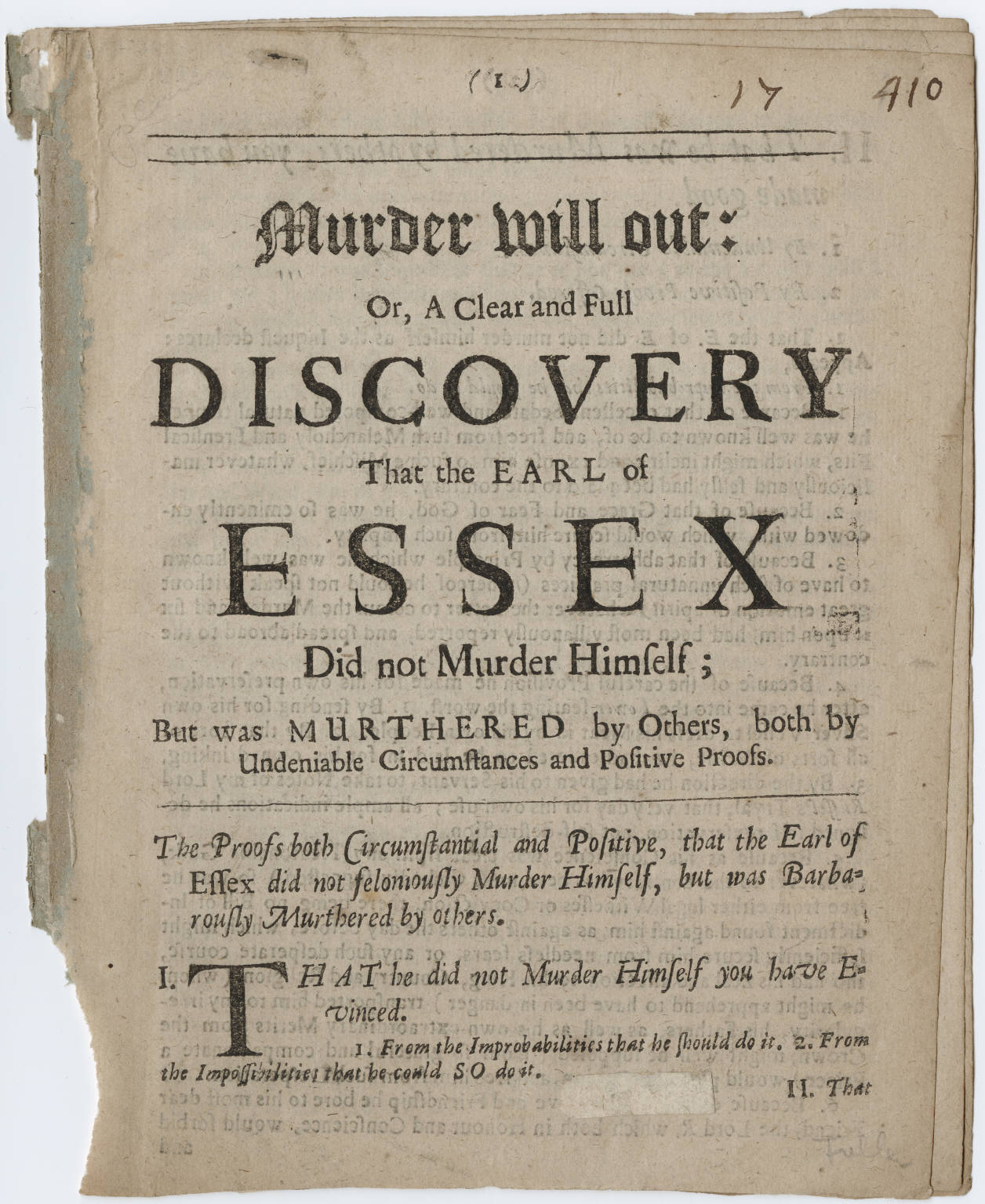
- "Murder will Out", a pamphlet published by Danvers in 1684 claiming the July 1683 suicide of Arthur Capell, 1st Earl of Essex was in fact state-sponsored murder

Commissioner, Staffordshire Militia
- In office July 1659 – April 1660

Member of Parliament for Leicestershire (Nominated to Barebone's Parliament)
- In office July 1653 – December 1653

Governor of Stafford
- In office 1650–1652

Parliamentary Committee for Staffordshire
- In office 1647–1652

Personal details
- Born: 8 July 1622 Swithland, Leicestershire
- Died: 1687 age 65 (approximate) Utrecht, Dutch Republic
- Spouse: Anne Coke (1644–1686 her death)
- Children: Samuel (1652–1693), Mercy (1654–1702) and William (1666–1740) (four others died young)
- Education: Trinity College, Cambridge
- Occupation: Political radical and preacher

Military service
- Allegiance: (Kingdom of England) Parliamentarians
- Rank: Colonel
- Battles/wars: First English Civil War; Second English Civil War

Henry Danvers (8 July 1622 to before March 1687) was an English religious and political radical from Leicestershire. He sided with Parliament in the Wars of the Three Kingdoms, serving on the Committee for Staffordshire from 1647 to 1652 and as Governor of Stafford from 1650 to 1652, during which time he became a General Baptist. He also contributed to the constitutional manifesto known as An Agreement of the People and was nominated as MP for Leicestershire in the short-lived Barebone's Parliament of 1653. Following the 1660 Stuart Restoration, he was associated with numerous plots to overthrow the regime and died in Utrecht in 1687.

== Personal details ==
Henry Danvers was born 8 July 1622 in Swithland, Leicestershire, second son of William Danvers (1591–1656), a minor member of the Landed gentry, and his wife Elizabeth Babington (died 1678). In March 1644, he married a distant relative, Ann Coke, daughter of Sir John Coke, Secretary of State to Charles I from 1625 to 1640. They had seven children, of whom only three survived to adulthood; Samuel (1652–1693), Mercy (1654–1702) and William (1666–1740).

== Career ==
Danvers is thought to have attended Trinity College, Cambridge and like his father supported Parliament when the First English Civil War began in August 1642. While the details of his military service are unclear, in 1647 he was appointed to the Committee for Staffordshire, one of the Parliamentary bodies set up to administer local government during the civil war. Following the 1647 Putney Debates, he was associated with Thomas Harrison and other radicals in drafting the constitutional manifesto known as An Agreement of the People. In 1650, he was appointed Colonel of the Staffordshire Militia and governor of Stafford, a position he retained until 1652. During the 1650 to 1651 Anglo-Scottish War, he was commended by the English Council of State for raising troops to oppose the Scottish invasion which ended at the Battle of Worcester in September 1651.

Originally a religious Independent, during his time in Stafford Danvers became a General Baptist, a sect whose members included many radicals within the New Model Army and the Levellers. In early 1653, he was nominated to Barebone's Parliament as MP for Leicestershire and moved to London where he joined the church of Edmund Chillenden. In 1657, when he held the rank of major, Danvers, with Harrison, Vice-admiral Lawson, Colonel Rich, and other Baptists, was placed under arrest on suspicion of being concerned in a conspiracy against Oliver Cromwell's life.

A few months after Cromwell's death in September 1658, Danvers was appointed Commissioner of the Staffordshire Militia in June 1659 but lost all his offices following the 1660 Stuart Restoration. In June 1661, he was rumoured to be planning a rebellion in conjunction with Clement Ireton and in early 1662 was accused of involvement in an alleged plan to assassinate Charles II known as the "Tong Plot". He managed to evade arrest although four other conspirators were executed.

Around 1663, reports had Danvers in disguise visiting the ejected minister Anthony Palmer, and linked to other radical plotters: the imprisoned John Breman, George Joyce in the Netherlands, and John Toomes. He returned to London in August 1665 and was arrested but rescued by a crowd whilst being taken to the Tower of London. Danvers vested his estate with trustees, to shelter it; and was joint-elder of a Baptist congregation near Aldgate, London. In the late 1670s he supported Algernon Sidney in efforts to be elected a Member of Parliament. In December 1684 he published a seditious libel alleging the supposed suicide of Arthur Capell, 1st Earl of Essex was in fact state-sponsored murder and the government offered a reward for his apprehension.

When the Catholic James II succeeded his brother Charles in February 1685, Danvers attended private meetings where William Disney briefed him and John Wildman on the planning for Monmouth's Rebellion. Although cautious not to commit himself, he may have agreed to raise London in favour of the Duke of Monmouth. Also involved in the London plotting was Matthew Meade, who lingered in Essex. Then Nathaniel Hooke was sent to London and Danvers, as Monmouth moved into Somerset. At first he said he would not take up arms till the duke was proclaimed king; and when Monmouth had been proclaimed, that republicans were absolved from all engagements to a leader who had broken faith. On 27 July 1687 a royal proclamation was issued commanding Danvers and others to appear before his majesty or to surrender themselves in twenty days. Danvers succeeded in escaping to the Dutch Republic, and died at Utrecht at the end of 1687.

== Works ==
Danvers wrote:

- Certain Queries concerning Liberty of Conscience propounded to those Ministers (so called) of Leicestershire, when they first met to consult that representation … afterwards so publiquely fathered upon that country, London [27 March 1640].
- Theopolis, or the City of God, New Jerusalem, in opposition to the City of the Nations, Great Babylon, being a comment on Revelation, chs. xx. xxi. (anon.), London, 1672.
- A Treatise of Laying on of Hands, with the History thereof, both from the Scripture and Antiquity, London, 1674.
- A Treatise of Baptism: wherein that of Believers and that of Infants is examined by the Scriptures, 2nd edit. London, 1674. This treatise brought upon him a number of adversaries, particularly Obadiah Wills, Richard Blinman, and Richard Baxter. To these he replied in three treatises in 1675. Wills was answered by a group of leading Baptists in The Baptists Answer to Mr Obed. Wills (1675), by Thomas Delaune, Daniel Dyke, Henry Forty, John Gosnold, William Kiffin, and Hanserd Knollys. They conceded some errors by Danvers.
  - Henry Danvers (1675). A Treatise of Baptism: wherein that of believers and that of infants is examined by the Scriptures. With the history of both out of antiquity ... As also, the history of Christianity amongst the ancient Britains and Waldenses. And, a brief answer to Mr. Bunyan about communion with persons unbaptized ... By H. D. i.e. Henry Danvers. Francis Smith.
- Murder will out: or, a clear and full discovery that the Earl of Essex did not feloniously murder himself, but was barbarously murthered by others: both by undeniable circumstances and positive proofs, London, 1689. Danvers, Lawrence Braddon and Robert Ferguson argued that, as part of the Stuart backlash after the Rye House Plot, Arthur Capell, 1st Earl of Essex had been murdered to ensure the conviction of William Russell, Lord Russell, and cover up Catholic activism.
  - Murder will out: or, a Clear and full discovery that the Earl of Essex did not feloniously murder himself, but was barbarously murthered by others: both by undeniable circumstances, and positive proofs. Written ... in the year 1684. and now published for the general information of all Protestants. London: E. R.& J. R. 1689.
- Solomon's Proverbs, English and Latin, alphabetically collected for help of memory. In English by H. D., and since made Latin by S. Perkins, late school-master of Christ Church Hospital, new edit. London, 1689.
  - Henry Danvers (1676). Solomon's Proverbs [from the books of Proverbs and Ecclesiastes], English and Latin. Alphabetically collected for help of memory. Fitted for the use of schools. By J. R. for William Redmayne.

Books on Danvers:

- Thomas Grantham (1674). The fourth principle of Christs doctrine vindicated, a brief answer to Henry Danvers book, intituled, A Treatise of Laying on of Hands.
- Richard Blinman (1675). A Rejoinder to Mr. Henry Danvers, his brief friendly reply to my answer about infant baptism, etc. London: Thomas Wall, Bristol Bookseller.

== Sources ==
- Abbott, W.C. (1909). "English Conspiracy and Dissent, 1660-1674". American Historical Review. 14 (3): 503–528. JSTOR 1836444.
- Danvers, Tony (2010). Memorials of the Danvers Family of Swithland & Shepshed (PDF). Central Print Services.
- Greaves, Richard (2004). "Danvers, Henry (b. in or before 1619, d. 1687/8)". Oxford Dictionary of National Biography (online ed.). Oxford University Press. doi:10.1093/ref:odnb/7134. (Subscription, Wikipedia Library access or UK public library membership required.)
- Greaves, Richard (1986). Deliver Us from Evil: The Radical Underground in Britain, 1660-1663. Oxford University Press. ISBN 978-0-19-503985-6.
- * Mather, Jean (1979). "The Parliamentary Committees and the Justices of the Peace, 1642-1661". The American Journal of Legal History. 23 (2): 120–143. doi:10.2307/845227.
- Zook, Melinda (2004). "Disney, William". Oxford Dictionary of National Biography (online ed.). Oxford University Press. doi:10.1093/ref:odnb/67266. (Subscription, Wikipedia Library access or UK public library membership required.)
- Zook, Melinda (2010). Radical Whigs and Conspiratorial Politics in Late Stuart England. Penn State Press. ISBN 978-0-271-03986-2.

Attribution

This article incorporates text from a publication now in the public domain: Stephen, Leslie, ed. (1888). "Danvers, Henry (died 1687)". Dictionary of National Biography. Vol. 14. London: Smith, Elder & Co.
