= Thomas Collier (Unitarian) =

English General Baptist preacher, evangelist and Arian polemicist

Thomas Collier (c. 1615 – c. 1691) was an English Baptist and Unitarian preacher, writer, and polemicist.

== Life ==
Thomas Edwards in his Gangræna alleged that Collier originally was an illiterate carter or husbandman. In 1634, when he was described as of Witley, Surrey, he was complained of for obstinately refusing to pay taxation in the tithing of Enton, in the parish of Godalming, where he had an estate. The taxes included the ship money, which Charles I of England had tried to levy without the consent of Parliament.

Becoming a Baptist and preacher, though without academic education, he preached for some time in Guernsey, where he made many converts, but ultimately he and some of his followers were banished from the island for their views and turbulent behaviour, and he was imprisoned at Portsmouth. In, or perhaps shortly before, 1646, he was a preacher at York. About the same period, there are traces of him at Guildford, Lymington, Southampton, Waltham, Poole, Taunton, London, and Putney; and in 1652 he was preacher at Westbury, Somerset. At one time, he was minister at Luppitt and Up-Ottery, Devon. What became of him after the English Restoration is not clear, but it is probable that he was living in 1691, when the last of his numerous publications came from the press.

He was the subject of Thomas Hall's The Collier and his Colours. His name is often mentioned with the Particular Baptist anti-trinitarian Paul Hobson (fl.1646-1670), who in 1663 conspired with a group of Fifth Monarchists and ex-Cromwell officers in the Farnley Wood Plot.

The controversy surrounding his views was the catalyst for the writing and publication of the 1689 London Baptist Confession of Faith, still used at many Anglophone Particular Baptist churches.

== Works ==
From the 1640s to 1691, in a series of booklets, he eventually turned to an Arian position against the Trinity.

His works are:

- ‘Certain Queries, or points now in controversy examined,’ 1645.
- ‘The Exaltation of Christ,’ London 1646, with an epistle to the reader by Hanserd Knollys prefixed.
- Letters dated Guildford, 20 April 1646, and London, 2 May 1646: printed in Edwards's ‘Gangræna,’ ii. 51, 52, and in Benjamin Brook's Lives of the Puritans, iii. 28, 29.
- ‘The Marrow of Christianity,’ London 1647.
- ‘The Glory of Christ, and the Ruine of Antichrist, unvailed,’ 1647.
- ‘A Brief Discovery of the Corruption of the Ministry of the Church of England,’ Lond. 1647.
- ‘A Discovery of the New Creation. In a Sermon preached at the Head-Quarters at Putney,’ London 1647.
- ‘A Vindication of the Army Remonstrance,’ London 1648. This was in reply to a tract by William Sedgwick.
- ‘A General Epistle to the Universall Church of the First Born,’ London 1648.
- ‘A Second Generall Epistle to all the Saints,’ London 1649.
- ‘The Heads and Substance of his Discourse with John Smith and Charles Carlile,’ London 1651.
- ‘Narrative of the Conference between John Smith and Thomas Collier,’ London 1652.
- ‘The Pulpit-guard routed in its twenty Strongholds,’ London 1652, in answer to a book published in the previous year by Thomas Hall of King's Norton, Worcestershire, entitled ‘The Pulpit guarded.’ Hall replied to Collier, who published a rejoinder, with answers to comments which had been made on his work by John Ferriby and Richard Saunders
- ‘The Right Constitution and True Subjects of the Visible Church of Christ,’ London 1654.
- ‘A Brief Answer to some of the Objections and Demurs made against the coming in and inhabiting of the Jews in this Commonwealth,’ London 1656.
- ‘A Looking-glasse for the Quakers,’ London 1657. In reply to James Naylor.
- ‘A Discourse of the true Gospel-Blessedness in the New Covenant,’ London 1659.
- ‘The Decision of the Great Point now in Controversie about the Interest of Christ and the Civill Magistrate in the Government of this World,’ London 1659.
- ‘The Body of Divinity,’ London 1674.
- ‘Additional Word to the Body of Divinity,’ 167–, to which Nehemiah Coxe published a reply.
- ‘A Doctrinal Discourse of Self-denial,’ London 1691.
