= John Griffith (Baptist minister) =

English minister

John Griffith (c. 1622 — 1700) was an English General Baptist minister and physician.

== Life ==
Little is known about John Griffith's early life. Griffith was born around 1622. He received university education, a medical training, and was known as Dr. Griffith.

He became convinced of Baptists views in 1640, was subsequently baptized, and established the Dunning's Alley church, Bishopsgate Street Without, in London around 1646.

After the English Restoration of 1660, Griffith frequently got into trouble as a conventicle preacher; and persistently declined the oath of allegiance. His difficulty was that the terms of the oath bound him to obey laws not then in being, and future sovereigns who might be Roman Catholic. Griffith was imprisoned at Newgate Prison in 1661 for 17 months. He was again committed on 18 April 1683, and is said to have spent 14 years in gaol.

Griffith was free from molestation after James II's 1687 Declaration of Indulgence. In 1698, the Dunning's Alley church which he ministered received an endowment under a trust created by Captain Pierce Johns' bequest. Griffith was an advocate of closed communion.

He died on 16 May 1700, aged 79 years old.

== Works ==
Griffith published:

- A Voice from the Word of the Lord, to … Quakers, 1654.
- Six Principles of the Christian Religion, 1655.
- Gods Oracle & Christs Doctrine, 1655, reply to Questions about Laying on of Hands (1655) by Edmund Chillenden, Henry Danvers, John Sturgion and others.
- A Complaint of the Oppressed, 1661.
- The Unlawfulness of Mixed Marriages, 1681.
- The Case of Mr. John Griffith, 1683. On the prosecution of that year of Griffith and Francis Bampfield for refusing the oath of allegiance.

Posthumous was

- Two Discourses, 1707, revised by J. Jenkins.

== Notes ==
Attribution

This article incorporates text from a publication now in the public domain: Stephen, Leslie; Lee, Sidney, eds. (1890). "Griffith, John (1622?-1700)". Dictionary of National Biography. Vol. 23. London: Smith, Elder & Co.
