= Richard Farnworth =

Richard Farnworth or Farnsworth (died 1666) was an English Quaker writer of tracts.

== Life ==
Farnworth was born in the north of England, and appears to have been a labouring man. In 1651 he attended the Quaker yearly meeting at Balby in Yorkshire, where he resided, when he was convinced by the preaching of George Fox. Joining the Society of Friends, became a minister. For some time he seems to have attached himself to Fox, with whom he visited Swarthmore in 1652. During this year he interrupted a congregation at a church in or near Wakefield, but was permitted to leave without molestation.

In 1655 Farnworth was put out of a church in Worcester for asking a question of Richard Baxter, who was preaching, and in the same year was imprisoned at Banbury for not raising his hat to the mayor. He was offered his release if he would pay the gaoler's fees, which he refused to do on the ground that his imprisonment was illegal, when he was offered the oath of abjuration, and on his declining to take it was committed to prison for six months. The latter part of his life was spent in ministerial journeys.

Farnworth died in the parish of St. Thomas Apostle, London, on 29 June 1666, of fever. One of the more successful of the early Quaker ministers, he was praised by the Quaker historian William Sewel as "a man of notable gifts".

== Works ==
Farnworth wrote many tracts, which enjoyed a wide popularity during his lifetime, but his works were not collected. The major tracts were:

- A Discovery of Truth and Falsehood, discovered by the Light of God in the Inward Parts, 1653.
- The Generall Good, to all People, ...with God's covenanting with his people, 1653.
- An Easter Reckoning, or a Freewill Offering, in part by Thomas Adams, 1653.
- Light Risen out of Darkness Now in these Latter Days, 1653.
- Truth Cleared of Scandals, or Truth lifting up its Head above Scandals, 1654.
- The Ranters' Principles, 1655.
- Witchcraft cast out from the religious seed and Israel of God, 1655.
- The Brazen serpent lifted up on high, 1655.
- Antichrist's Man of War, apprehended and encountered withal by a Soulder of the Armie of the Lamb, 1655.
- The Holy Scriptures from Scandal are cleared, 1655. Contains responses to Thomas Pollard, The Holy Scripture Clearing it Self (1655), and John Griffith, True Gospel Faith.
- The Pure Language of the Spirit of Truth.
- A True Testimony against the Pope's Wages, 1656.
- Christian Tolleration, or simply and singly to meet upon the Account of Religion, really to Worship, 1664.
