= Faldo =

Faldo is a surname. Notable people with the surname include:

- John Faldo (1633–1690), English nonconformist minister and controversialist
- Nick Faldo (born 1957), English golfer
- Stephen Faldo, skipper of the pleasure boat Marchioness

Fictional characters:

- Waldo Faldo, character from the American television series Family Matters
