= John Sturgion =

English preacher and pamphleteer

John Sturgion (died 1665) was an English General Baptist preacher and pamphleteer.

== Life ==
Sturgion was a member of Edmund Chillenden's church in 1653. At one time a private in Oliver Cromwell's lifeguards, on 27 August 1655 he was arrested as the author of a pamphlet against Cromwell, now Lord Protector. He was discharged from the lifeguards and for a time imprisoned.

In 1656, Major-general William Goffe complained that Sturgion's preaching attracted large crowds at Reading, Berkshire. About July 1656, Sturgion and other Baptists sent an address to Charles II complaining of their sufferings under "that loathsome hypocrite" the Protector, and announcing their return to their allegiance to the king, begging him also to establish liberty of conscience and abolish tithes. He was suspected of a share in Miles Sindercombe's plot against Cromwell, became one of Edward Sexby's agents, and was arrested on 25 May 1657 with two bundles of Killing No Murder under his arms. For this he was committed to the Tower of London, where he remained till February 1659.

At the Restoration, Sturgion was appointed one of the messengers of the court of exchequer. In October 1662 he petitioned for leave to resign his place to Thomas Benbow, on the ground of bodily infirmity.

== Works ==
Sturgion was the author of:

- A Short Discovery of his Highness the Lord Protector's Intentions touching the Anabaptists in the Army (1655)
- A Plea for Toleration of Opinions and Persuasions in Matters of Religion differing from the Church of England (1661), addressed to Charles II. It consists largely of extracts from Jeremy Taylor's Liberty of Prophesying, and was reprinted in Tracts on Liberty of Conscience, edited by Edward Bean Underhill for the Hanserd Knollys Society in 1846.
