= William Jenkyn =

English clergyman

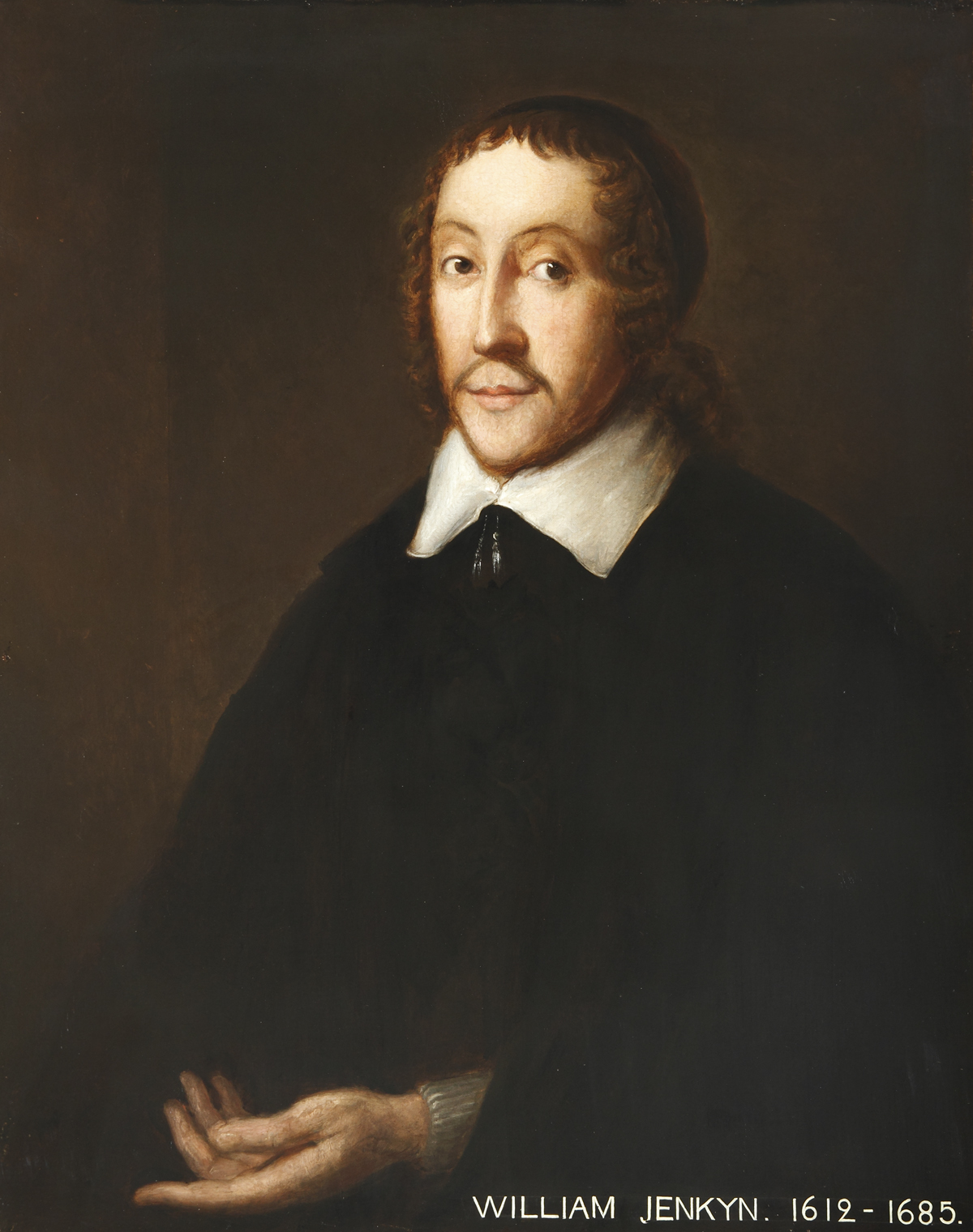

William Jenkyn (1613–1685) was an English clergyman, imprisoned during the Interregnum for his part in the 'Presbyterian plot' of Christopher Love, ejected minister in 1662, and imprisoned at the end of his life for nonconformity.

== Life ==
Jenkyn was the eldest son of William Jenkyn (died 1618), vicar of All Saints', Sudbury, Suffolk, born at Sudbury and baptised at All Saints' Church in December 1613. His father, son of a gentleman of landed property at Folkestone, Kent, had been disinherited for his Puritanism. His mother was daughter of Richard Rogers of Wethersfield, Essex. On his father's death his grandfather sent for him to Folkestone; when he was nine years old his mother, who had remarried, claimed him, gave him a good education.

He attended St John's College, Cambridge, where he matriculated on 3 July 1628. He graduated B.A. 1632, migrated to Emmanuel College in 1634, and graduated M.A. 1635. Some time afterwards he began to preach. Having held a lectureship at St. Nicholas Acons, London, he was presented by the crown (27 January 1641) to the rectory of St. Leonard's (or the Hythe), Colchester.

Fear of the ague brought him back to London about 1642. On 1 February 1643 he was admitted to the vicarage of Christ Church, Newgate, which had been vacated by the death of Edward Finch. A few months later he obtained in addition a lectureship at St. Anne's, Blackfriars, of which William Gouge, was rector. His controversy (1647–8) with John Goodwin exhibits him as a strong advocate of the presbyterian discipline.

Jenkyn was one of the Presbyterian remonstrants against the trial of Charles I, and would not observe the parliamentary thanksgiving for the destruction of the monarchy. His living was sequestrated (June 1650), and he was suspended from the ministry; his preferments were given to Christopher Feake. He retired for six months to Billericay, Essex. Returning to London he joined in the abortive plot of Christopher Love for the restoration of Charles II. Thomas Cawton, who had married his sister Elizabeth, was another of the plotters. Jenkyn was committed to the Tower of London, and escaped execution only by help of a very submissive petition to the government. John Arthur, D.D., rector of Clapham, Surrey, drew it up for him, and parliament ordered it to be printed (15 October 1651; on 21 July 1688 it was burned by order of the convocation of Oxford University). Jenkyn was released from prison, and his sequestration removed, He allowed Feake to retain the vicarage of Christ Church, but conducted a Sunday-morning lectureship there (at seven o'clock), and another at St. Anne's, Blackfriars. On Gouge's death he succeeded him (1654) as rector of St. Anne's, but resigned this preferment on being again presented, some time (probably 1655) after Feake's deprival, to the vicarage of Christ Church.

His popularity was now at its height: he preached before parliament (24 September 1656), and ceased to meddle with dangerous topics. Richard Baxter calls him a 'sententious, elegant preacher.' He welcomed the Restoration, but was ejected by the Act of Uniformity 1662.

Jenkyn preached two farewell sermons at Christ Church on 17 August 1662. He resolved to continue his ministry, and held conventicles in 1663. On the passing of the Conventicle Act (1664) he retired to a house of his own at King's Langley, Hertfordshire, and continued to preach there every Sunday. The indulgence of 1672 brought him back to London; his license (2 April) for 'a howse or chamber in Home Alley, in Aldersgate Street,' was the first registered under the indulgence. In the same year he was chosen one of the first conductors of the 'merchants' lecture,' established jointly by Presbyterians and Independents at Pinners' Hall. His congregation built a meeting-house for him in Jewin Street; he always prayed for the king and government, and his service were connived at from the withdrawal of the indulgence in 1673 until 1682. Edmund Calamy was present when his meeting was disturbed in the latter year by a band of soldiers.

After this he still preached privately, but was at length arrested (2 September 1684) while attending a prayer-meeting with three other ministers. His friends escaped; Jenkyn owed his arrest to his politeness in stopping for a lady whose train blocked the stair. Refusing the Oxford oath (binding him to endeavour to make no change in church or state), he was committed to Newgate Prison without option of a fine. His health soon failed; an ineffectual petition for his release was backed by medical certificate confirming that his life was in danger. He was forbidden to pray with any visitors, even his own daughter.

He died in Newgate on 19 January 1685, and was buried in Bunhill Fields burial ground.

== Personal life ==
He was twice married, one of his wives being a daughter of Daniel Rogers; his only son, William, was executed at Taunton, on 30 September 1685, aged about 22, for complicity in Monmouth's rebellion.

His sister was married to the preacher Thomas Cawton.

== Works ==
Jenkyn published a number of separate sermons, 1643–75, including a Latin concio ad theologos Londinensos (1659), funeral sermons for William Gouge (1654), and Lazarus Seaman (1675). Also:

- The Busie Bishop, or the Visitor Visited, &c., 1648, and The Blind Guide, or Doling Doctor, &.. 1648, (these two against John Goodwin).
- Certain Conscientious Queries, &c., 1651, (a defence of his petition after Love's plot).
- An Exposition of the Epistle of Jude, &c, 1652-4, 2 vols.; reprinted 1658, fol. 1 vol.; also Glasgow, 1783, and London, 1840, 8vo, edited by James Sherman (Robert Grove, afterwards bishop of Chichester, accused him of plagiarising from Thomas Adams.
- Celeuma; seu Clamor ad Coelum adversus Theologos Hierarchiae Anglicanae, &c., 1679, (a vindication of the strong language used in his funeral sermon for Seaman).
- Refutatio eujusdem Scripti . . . Rob. Grovii, &c., 1681, fol. (defence of the foregoing from the Responsio, 1680, of Grove).

Verses by him are prefixed to the Marrow of Ecclesiastical History, 1654, by Samuel Clarke. He prefixed an epistle to Jonathan Clapham's Full Discovery ... of the Quakers, &c., 1656; and subscribed the epistle prefixed to the second edition (1676) of Quakerism no Christianity, by John Faldo.

His farewell sermons are in the Compleat Collection, &c., 1663; three of his sermons are in A Supplement to the Morning Exercise at Cripplegate, 1674–1676. He dissuaded Louis du Moulin from translating into Latin John Durel's View of the Government ... in the Reformed Churches (1662), threatening him, according to Anthony à Wood, with eternal damnation if he did it.
