= Jacob C. Gottschalk =

American Mennonite bishop

Jacob Gottschalk (Godtschalk) Henricks van der Heggen (c.1670 – c.1763) was the first person to serve as a Mennonite bishop in the United States.

== Life ==
Gottschalk was born around 1670 in Germany, in Goch, a town at the Dutch border. In 1701, he received a letter from the church in Goch, permitting him to migrate to Pennsylvania, where he arrived at Germantown, Pennsylvania, in 1702. On August 10, 1702, he became a preacher to the Mennonite congregation there.

He died in May 1763, and his grave is unmarked; however, there is a memorial stone at the Towamencin Meeting churchyard at Kulpsville, Montgomery County, Pennsylvania that reads:

In memory of Bishop Jacob Gottshall 1670-1763 Born in Goch, Germany, ordained a bishop in the Germantown Mennonite Church in 1702 and also served the Skippack and Towamencin congregations. He performed the first baptism and conducted the first communion service in the American church in 1708. The Skippack alms audits were signed by him from 1745 to 1757. He owned a farm of 120 acres (0.49 km^{2}) which included this church site. Undoubtedly, he is buried here but no marker remains, therefore this marker is erected in memory of this energetic leader.

== Ministry ==
Around 1690, the Germantown Mennonite congregation elected William Rittenhouse as its first preacher and Jan Neuss as a deacon. The first ordained bishop of the congregation was Jacob Gottschalk who came to America in 1702.

In 1708, Jacob joined in a letter to friends in Amsterdam requesting their European friends to send them some catechisms, besides psalm books and Bibles as there was but one copy of the Bible in their whole membership.

In 1712, he had the Dordrecht Confession of Faith translated into English and printed.

In 1725, he met with sixteen other ministers from southeastern Pennsylvania and adopted the Dutch Mennonite Dordrecht Confession of Faith (1632). They also wrote the following endorsement of which he was the first to sign:

We the hereunder written Servants of the Word of God, and Elders in the Congregation of the People, called Mennonists, in the Province of Pennsylvania, do acknowledge, and herewith make known, that we do own the foregoing Confession, Apendix, and Menno's Excusation, to be according to our Opinion; and also, have took the same to be wholly ours. In Testimony whereof, and that we believe that same to be good, we have here unto Subscribed our Names.

In 1745, he arranged with the Ephrata Cloister to have them translate from Dutch into German and print Thieleman J. van Braght's 1660 The Bloody Theatre or Martyrs Mirror of Defenseless Christians, the work took 15 men three years to finish and in 1749, at 1512 pages, was the largest book printed in America before the Revolutionary War. One of the original volumes is now on display at the Ephrata Cloister.

== Family ==
Jacob Gottschalk was the son of Gottschalk Thonis (Theunissen) and Lehntgen Henrichs. His surname, Gottschalk, was a patronymic where he was born. Sometime after he moved to America he began to use versions of Gottschalk as his family name.

Jacob's children, as listed in his will, were son Herman, deceased son Godshalk, deceased son John, deceased daughter Magadalene, and daughter Anna married to Peter Custard. Jacob Godshalk's will was written on 26 December 1760 and proved on 3 June 1763.
