= Martyrs Mirror =

1660 history of the persecution of Anabaptists

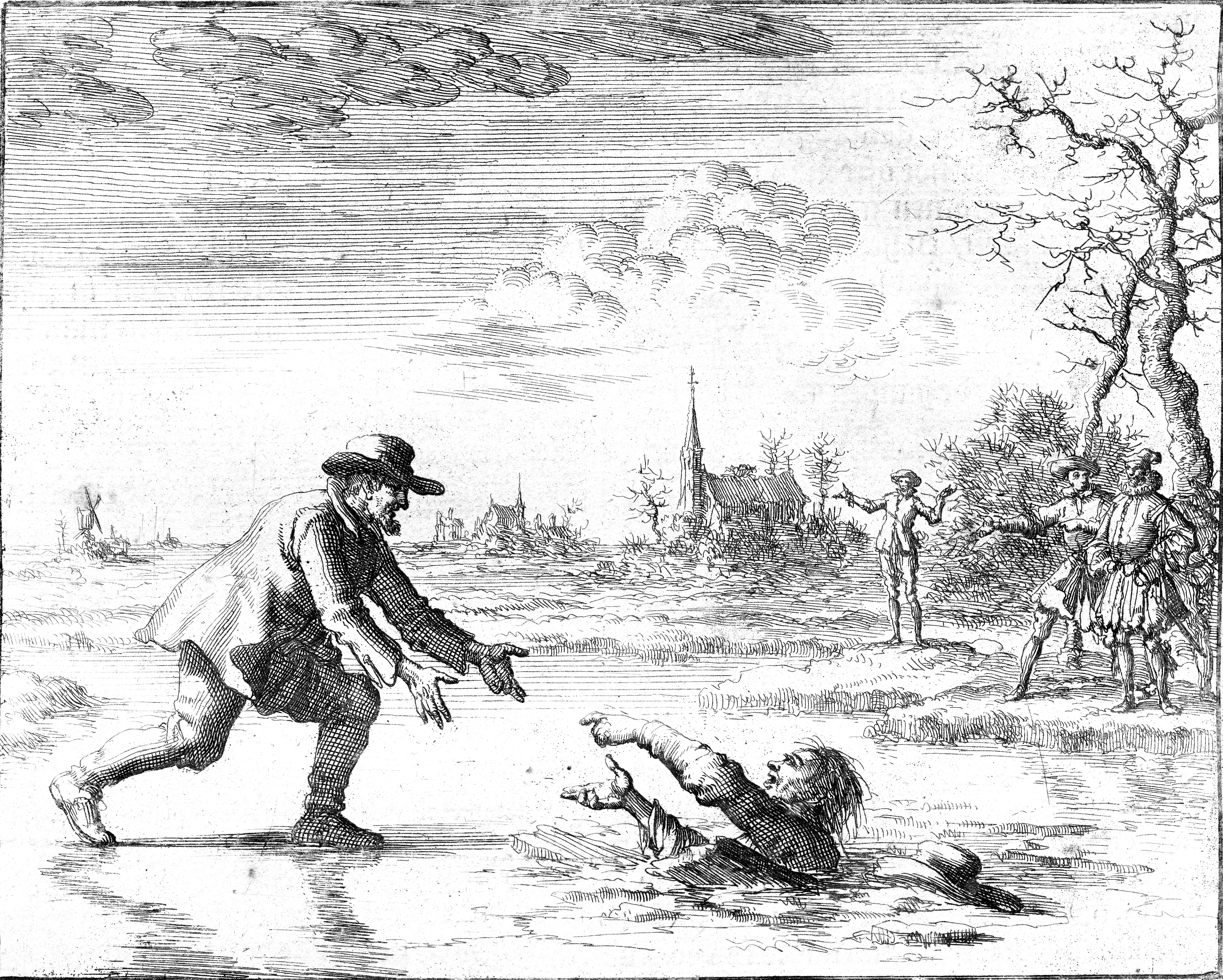
Anabaptist Dirk Willems rescues his pursuer and is subsequently burned at the stake in 1569.

Martyrs Mirror (Note: Dutch: Martelaersspiegel) or The Bloody Theater, (Note: Dutch: Het bloedig toneel) first published in Holland in 1660 in Dutch by Thieleman J. van Braght, documents the stories and testimonies of Christian martyrs, especially Anabaptists. The full title of the book is The Bloody Theater or Martyrs Mirror of the Defenseless Christians who baptized only upon confession of faith, and who suffered and died for the testimony of Jesus, their Saviour, from the time of Christ to the year A.D. 1660. (Note: Dutch: Het bloedig toneel, of Martelaersspiegel der Doops-gesinde of weereloose christenen, die, om 't getuygenis van Jesus haren Salighmaker, geleden hebben, ende gedood zijn, van Christi tijd af, tot desen tijd toe) The use of the word defenseless in this case refers to the Anabaptist belief in non-resistance. The book includes accounts of the martyrdom of the apostles and the stories of martyrs from previous centuries with beliefs similar to the Anabaptists.

== Reception and impact ==
Next to the Bible, the Martyrs Mirror has historically held the most significant and prominent place in Amish and Mennonite homes.

The Martyrs Mirror is still a beloved book among Amish and Mennonites. While less common now than in the 20th century, in Mennonite homes Martyrs Mirror is a common wedding gift.

== Surviving copper etchings used to illustrate the book ==
The 1685 edition of the book is illustrated with 104 copper etchings by Jan Luyken. Thirty-one of these plates survive and are part of the Mirror of the Martyrs exhibit at Bethel College in North Newton, Kansas. Two of the copper plates are located at the Muddy Creek Farm Library established by Amos B. Hoover in Ephrata, Pennsylvania.

== German translation in the 1740s ==
In 1745, Jacob Gottschalk arranged with the Ephrata Cloister to have them translate the Martyrs Mirror from Dutch into German and to print it. The work took 15 men three years to finish and in 1749, at 1,512 pages, it was the largest book printed in America before the Revolutionary War. An original volume is on display at the Ephrata Cloister.

== English translations in 1837 and 1850 ==
The first English edition, translated from German by I. Daniel Rupp, was published by David Miller near Lampeter Square, Lancaster County, Pennsylvania, in 1837. An edition entitled A Martyrology of the Churches of Christ was translated and printed in England in 1850 in 2 volumes by Edward Bean Underhill under the auspices of the Hanserd Knollys Society in England. The Martyrs Mirror differs from Foxe's Book of Martyrs in that it only includes those martyrs which were considered nonresistant, while Foxe's book does not include many Anabaptist martyrs.

== See also ==
- Foxe's Book of Martyrs (1563), by John Foxe
- List of Amish and their descendants
- Martyrology
- Christian martyr
