= Nehemiah Coxe =

Nehemiah Coxe (died 1689) was an English Particular Baptist minister, theologian, and physician. He is known for his contributions to seventeenth-century Reformed Baptist theology, particularly his work on covenant theology, and likely played a key editorial role in the preparation of the Second London Baptist Confession of Faith (1689) alongside William Collins.

== Early Life and background ==
Nehemiah Coxe was the son of Benjamin Coxe, a prominent early leader among the Particular Baptists. In 1669, he joined the Bedford church made famous by John Bunyan. In 1673, he was called to serve as pastor of a sub-congregation of the church in Hitchin. However, in 1674, he was censured by the Bedford congregation for unspecified "miscarriages." Some scholars suggest this may have been due to disagreements over the issue of open versus closed church membership, a contentious issue at the time. While Benjamin Coxe advocated a closed membership policy, John Bunyan and the Bedford church resisted such restrictions. Nehemiah's subsequent move to the closed-membership Petty France church supports this theory.

== Ministry and theological work ==
Coxe became a leading theological voice among the Particular Baptists. He was proficient in Latin, Greek, and Hebrew, and trained as a physician. In 1677, the London Baptist elders commissioned him to respond in print to the heterodox views of evangelist Thomas Collier. Coxe's resulting publication, Vindiciae Veritatis, was praised for its clarity, theological rigor, and humble tone. His peers wrote that he had "behaved himself with that modesty of Spirit, joined with that fulness and clearness of answer and strength of argument" that made the work a powerful antidote to theological error.

In 1681, Coxe published two additional works: A Sermon Preached at the Ordination of an Elder and Deacons in a Baptized Congregation in London and A Discourse of the Covenants that God Made with Men Before the Law. The latter became his most influential theological work. Charles Marie Du Veil, in his 1685 Commentary on Acts, referred to Coxe as "that great divine, eminent for all manner of learning" and described A Discourse of the Covenants as "excellent," containing "most weighty and solid arguments."

== Physician and public figure ==
Coxe received his Doctor of Medicine degree in 1684 and became a fellow of the Royal College of Physicians in 1687. He continued to serve in ministry and theological education, particularly in the Petty France church where he ministered alongside William Collins.

== Role in the 1689 Confession ==
Coxe is widely regarded as having played a significant role in preparing the Second London Baptist Confession of Faith (1689). Although he died before the General Assembly of 1689, his theological writings, particularly on covenant theology, strongly influenced the final document.

== Death and legacy ==
Nehemiah Coxe died on 5 May 1689, just three days after writing his will. He was buried in the Portman family vault in Bunhill Fields, near the grave of John Owen. His tombstone read:

To Nehemiah Cox M.D. who married Margaret 2d. Daught. of ye sd. Edm[ond] & Eliz[abeth] [Portmans] Ob. May 5th. 1689. Also to Edm[und] only son of the said Nehemiah and Marg[aret] Cox. Ob. Aug. 11th. 1688.

Omnia sunt hominum tenui pendentia filo: Et subito casu, quæ valuere, ruunt.

("All human things hang on a slender thread: the strongest fall with a sudden crash." – Ovid)

He left behind his second wife, Margaret, and a son, Benjamin, from a previous marriage. His only son with Margaret, Edmund, had died the previous year.

== Reputation ==
Coxe was highly esteemed by his contemporaries and by later generations of Baptists. He was frequently referred to as:

- "That great Divine, eminent for all manner of Learning" – Charles Marie Du Veil
- "The Learned Mr. N. Cox" – Benjamin Dennis
- "A learned writer" – Thomas Grantham
- "The late learned Dr. Neh. Coxe" – William Russel
- "A very excellent, learned, and judicious divine" – Thomas Crosby

His theological works—particularly his covenant theology—remain influential within the Reformed Baptist tradition.

Coxe once wrote:

Monuments are not to be erected to the Righteous, when deceased; Their Words are their Monuments.

This quote was later used in his posthumously published work A Believer's Triumph Over Death, and it serves as a fitting summary of his legacy.

== Bibliography ==
- Coxe, Nehemiah. Vindiciae Veritatis: Or, a Confutation of the Heresies and Gross Errours Asserted by Thomas Collier. London, 1677.
- Coxe, Nehemiah. A Sermon Preached at the Ordination of an Elder and Deacons in a Baptized Congregation in London. London, 1681.
- Coxe, Nehemiah. A Discourse of the Covenants That God Made with Men Before the Law. London, 1681.
- Reprinted in Covenant Theology: From Adam to Christ, edited by Ronald D. Miller, James M. Renihan, and Francisco Orozco. RBAP, 2005.
- Second London Baptist Confession of Faith (1689). https://1689londonbaptistconfession.com/
