= Hanserd Knollys =

English minister, divine, and schoolmaster (1598 – 1691)

The Reverend Hanserd Knollys
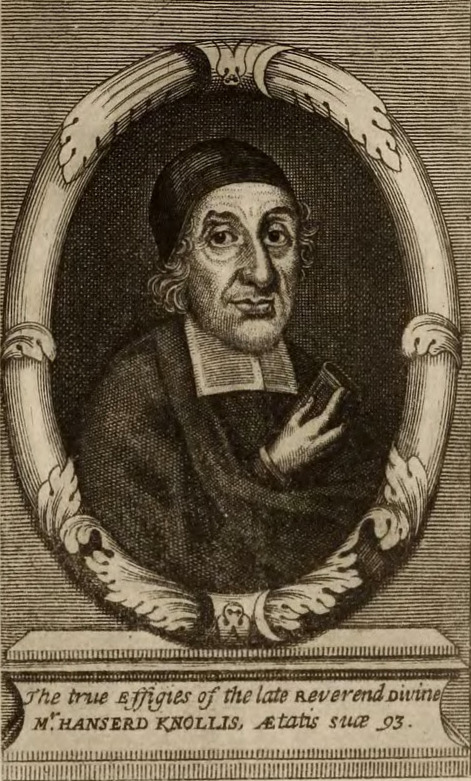
- Engraving of Hanserd Knollys
- Born: Hanserd Knollys; 1598; Cawkwell, Lincolnshire, Kingdom of England
- Died: September 19, 1691 (aged 92–93); Islington, London, Kingdom of England
- Education: St Catharine's College
- Occupations: Minister; Theologian; Schoolmaster
- Notable work: The Rudiments of the Hebrew Grammar in English
- Spouse: Unknown (d. 30 April 1671) (m. 1630)
- Children: Isaac (d. 16 November 1671); other 2 unknown sons; 1 unknown daughter
- Theological work
- Era: Transition of Renaissance to the Age of Enlightenment
- Tradition or movement: Baptist
- Main interests: Hebrew

Ordination history
History
Diaconal ordination
- Ordained by: John Williams, Bishop of the Diocese of Lincoln
Priestly ordination
- Ordained by: John Williams, Bishop of the Diocese of Lincoln

Hanserd Knollys (1598 – 1691) was an English Particular Baptist minister, divine (theologian), and schoolmaster.

== Life ==
Hanserd Knollys was born at Cawkwell, Lincolnshire, in 1598. He was educated privately under a tutor, and later was for a short time educated at Great Grimsby grammar school. Knollys afterwards was matriculated at St Catharine's College, Cambridge, in 1627 or 1629. Leaving the university, Knollys became schoolmaster of the Queen Elizabeth's High School at Gainsborough, Lincolnshire. In 1620, he was ordained in the Church of England as deacon on 29 June. On the next day, 30 June, Knollys was ordained priest by John Williams, Bishop of Lincoln, and was presented by Williams to the vicarage of Humberston, Lincolnshire. In addition to being a vicar, Knollys preached every Sunday in the neighbouring parish churches of Holton-le-Clay and Scartho. Two or three years later, he resigned his living owing to scruples about ceremonies and admission to the Eucharist, but continued his preaching office.

=== Nonconformism ===
In 1636, Knollys came to Nonconformist ideas and renounced his orders. He removed to London with his wife and family. Shortly afterwards, he fled to New England to escape the Court of High Commission. A warrant from the Court reached Knollys at Boston, Massachusetts, but after a brief imprisonment he was allowed to remain unmolested. During his time in New England, Knollys preached at Dover, New Hampshire, and adopted credobaptism. Cotton Mather enumerated him among 'godly Anabaptists;' quite when he adopted the doctrine is not clear.

On 24 December 1641, Knollys returned to England and reached London, due to his aged father. He founded a boarding-school in Great Tower Hill. Soon afterwards, Knollys was elected to the mastership of the free school in St. Mary Axe. After about a year, he temporarily left to become an army chaplain. Dissatisfied with the parliamentary commanders, he returned to London and his school-keeping. Knollys learned Hebrew from Christian Ravis of Berlin. In 1644, he preached in the London and Suffolk churches and churchyards, and occasionally, in what afterwards became quaker fashion, endeavouring to supplement the regular sermon by a discourse of his own. This led, according to Thomas Edwards, to tumults. Knollys was twice brought before a committee of parliament, but on each occasion was absolved from blame and protected. In 1645, with Benjamin Cox and others, Knollys was the author of A Declaration concerning the Publicke Dispute which should have been in the Meeting House of Aldermanbury, December 3 1645, concerning infant baptism.

He gathered a church in 1646, meeting first for about a year, in Great St. Helen's, then in Finsbury Fields, next in Coleman Street, subsequently in George Yard, Whitechapel, and ultimately at Broken Wharf, Thames Street. His most important convert was Henry Jessey, whom he baptised in June 1645. Knollys wrote a letter on 11 January 1646 to John Dutton of Norwich, in favour of toleration, printed by Edwards in Gangraena; embittered the Presbyterians against him. Knollys, in the next year, subscribed the second edition (1646) of the First London Confession of Faith, drafted up by Baptists in London. On 17 January 1649, the Parliament of England gave a commission to Knollys and William Kiffin to preach in Suffolk, on petition from inhabitants of Ipswich. His name is attached to pleas for toleration addressed to the Parliament in 1651 and 1654, and to Oliver Cromwell on 3 April 1657.

Between 1645 and the Restoration, Knollys met with no interference. He held some offices of profit under the Commonwealth of England. On the outbreak of Thomas Venner's insurrection, on 7 January 1661, Knollys was committed to Newgate Gaol on suspicion, and detained until the act of grace on King Charles II's coronation, on 23 April, liberated him; but still was not safe for Knollys to resume his ministry in London. After a time in Wales and Lincolnshire, Knollys went to Germany (then the Holy Roman Empire), where he remained for two or three years, and returned at length to London by way of Rotterdam. In his absence, Colonel William Legge in the king's name took possession of his property.

In London he once more resumed his school and his pastorate, preaching also a morning lecture on Sundays at Pinners' Hall, Old Broad Street, then in the hands of independents. On 10 May 1670 he was arrested at his meeting in George Yard, under the Conventicles Act 1670. He was committed to the Bishopgate compter, but was considerately treated and was allowed to preach to the prisoners; at the next Old Bailey sessions he obtained his discharge. He survived the Act of Toleration 1689 and despite old age, took part in efforts to consolidate the Baptists. He continued preaching to the last, with Robert Steed as his assistant.

He died on 19 September 1691, in his ninety-third year, and was buried in Bunhill Fields. The funeral sermon was preached by Thomas Harrison (1699–1702), particular Baptist minister at Petty France, and afterwards at Loriners' Hall. He married in 1630 or 1631; his wife died on 30 April 1671; he had at least three sons and a daughter; Isaac, his last surviving son, died on 16 November 1671.

== Works ==
- A Glimpse of Sion's Glory (1641)
- Christ Exalted (1645)
- An Exposition of the Eleventh Chapter of Revelation (1679)
- An Exposition of the First Chapter of the Song of Solomon (1656)
- An Exposition of the Whole Book of Revelation (1689)
- Mystical Babylon Unveiled ... (1679)
- The Parable of the Kingdom of Heaven Expounded (1674)
- The Rudiments of the Hebrew Grammar in English (1648)
- The Shining of a Flaming-fire in Zion (1646)

== Legacy ==
The Hanserd Knollys Society was founded in London in 1845, "for the publication of the works of early English and other Baptist writers". A total of ten volumes were published. Seven of the volumes were edited by Edward Bean Underhill. Other volumes were edited by George Offor, the Reverend C. Stovel, and the Reverend F. A. Cox. The two volumes by Thieleman J. van Braght were translated from the Dutch by the Reverend Benjamin Millard, while the first of the two volumes has illustrations by the engraver Jan Luyken.

- E. Underhill, ed. (1846). Tracts on Liberty of Conscience. Hanserd Knollys Society.
- E. Underhill, ed. (1847). The Records of a Church of Christ: Meeting in Broadmead, Bristol, 1640-1687. Hanserd Knollys Society.
- John Bunyan (1847). G. Offor (ed.). The Pilgrim's Progress. Hanserd Knollys Society.
- Roger Williams (1848). E. Underhill (ed.). The Bloudy Tenet of Persecution. Hanserd Knollys Society.
- John Canne (1849). C. Stovel (ed.). A Necessity of Separation from the Church of England. Hanserd Knollys Society.
- T. J. Van Braght; Jan Luiken (1850). E. Underhill (ed.). A Martyrology of the Churches of Christ, Commonly Called Baptists, During the Era of the Reformation. Vol. 1. Hanserd Knollys Society.
- T. J. Van Braght (1853). A Martyrology of the Churches of Christ, Commonly Called Baptists, During the Era of the Reformation. Vol. 2. Hanserd Knollys Society.
- C. M. Du Veil (1851). F. A. Cox (ed.). A Commentary on the Acts of the Apostles. Hanserd Knollys Society.
- E. Underhill, ed. (1854). Records of the Churches of Christ, Gathered at Fenstanton, Warboys, and Hexham, 1644-1720. Hanserd Knollys Society.
- E. Underhill, ed. (1854). Confessions of Faith and Other Public Documents Illustrative of the History of the Baptist Churches of England in the 17th Century. Hanserd Knollys Society.

== Bibliography ==
- This article incorporates text from a publication now in the public domain: "Knollys, Hanserd". Dictionary of National Biography. London: Smith, Elder & Co. 1885–1900.
- Barry H. Howson (2001). Erroneous and Schismatical Opinions: The Questions of Orthodoxy Regarding the Theology of Hanserd Knollys (c. 1599-1691). Leiden: Brill. ISBN 90-04-11997-3.
- Dennis C. Bustin (2006). Paradox and Perseverance: Hanserd Knollys, Particular Baptist Pioneer in Seventeenth-Century England. Eugene, Oregon: Wipf & Stock Publishers. ISBN 978-1-59752-874-0.
- William L. Pitts, Jr.; Rady Roldán-Figueroa (2017). The Collected Works of Hanserd Knollys: Pamphlets on Religion. Mercer University Press. ISBN 978-0-88146-610-2.
- Hanserd Knollys (1646). The Shining of a Flaming-fire in Zion. London.
- Richard Bartlett (1837). Memoir of Hanserd Knollys. New Hampshire Historical Society. pp. 175–.
- "Hanserd Knollys in America". Christian Review. XXIII. Baltimore. Maryland: 438–. 1858.
