= Edward Finch (divine) =

English Royalist divine

Edward Finch (fl. 1630 – 1641) was an English Royalist divine.

== Life ==
Finch is said by Walker and others to have been brother of John, Lord Finch of Fordwich, and thus younger son of Sir Henry Finch, by Ursula, daughter of John Thwaites of Kent.

On 9 December 1630 Edward was admitted to the vicarage of Christ Church, Newgate, London. Walker celebrates him as the first of the parochial clergy actually dispossessed by the committee for scandalous ministers. A resolution of Parliament, 8 May 1641, declared him unfit to hold any benefice. The articles against him allege that he had set up the communion table altarwise, and preached in a surplice; they also detail a list of charges more or less affecting his character. Walker, who had not seen the pamphlet containing the articles and evidence in the case, makes the best of Finch's printed defence, but on Finch's own showing there was ground for scandal.

Finch died soon after his sequestration; his successor, William Jenkyn, was admitted on 1 February 1642, "per mort. Finch".'There is a doubt as to whether he was married: it was said that he had lived seven years apart from his wife, but he denied that he had a wife.

== Works ==
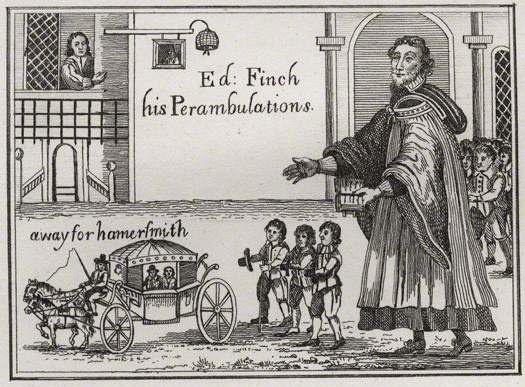
19th century engraving, copied from the woodcut in the 1641 pamphlet against Finch

Finch published An Answer to the Articles, London, 1641. This was in reply to The Petition and Articles . . . exhibited in Parliament against Edward Finch, Vicar of Christ's Church, London, and brother to Sir J. Finch, late Lord Keeper, 1641. This pamphlet has a woodcut of Finch, and a cut representing his journey to Hammersmith with a party of alleged loose characters. The main point of Finch's defence on this charge was that one of the party was his sister.
