= Henry Finch (died 1625) =

English barrister, legal writer and politician

Sir Henry Finch (died 1625) was an English lawyer and politician, created serjeant-at-law and knighted, and remembered as a legal writer.

== Life ==
He was born the son of Sir Thomas Finch of Eastwell and Catherine Moyle, daughter of Sir Thomas Moyle and the brother of Moyle Finch. He was educated at Christ's College, Cambridge, under Laurence Chaderton, graduating BA, and was admitted of Gray's Inn in 1577, and called to the bar there in 1585.

In February 1593, he was elected to parliament for Canterbury, and he retained the seat at the election of 1597. He became an ancient of his inn in 1593, and the same year was appointed counsel to the Cinque ports. He was reader at his inn in the autumn of 1604.

In 1613 he was appointed recorder of Sandwich, on 11 June 1616 he was called to the degree of serjeant-at-law, and nine days later he was knighted at Whitehall Palace. At this time he was engaged, in conjunction with Francis Bacon, William Noy, and others, in an abortive attempt to codify the statute law. He was elected to Parliament for St Albans in 1614.

He died in October 1625, and was buried in the parish church of Boxley, Kent. He had married Ursula, the daughter and heiress of John Thwaites of Kent, with whom he had two sons.

== Calling of the Jews ==
In 1621 he published a work entitled The World's Great Restauration, or Calling of the Jews, and with them of all Nations and Kingdoms of the Earth to the Faith of Christ. In it he seems to have predicted, in the near future, the restoration of temporal dominion to the Jews and the establishment by them of a worldwide empire. This caused James I to treat the work as a libel, and accordingly, Finch was arrested in April 1621. He obtained his liberty by disavowing all such portions of the work as might be construed as derogatory to the sovereign and apologising for having written unadvisedly. William Laud, in a sermon preached in July 1621, referred to the book, and it was suppressed. Judaic scholar Mel Scult sees Finch’s work as calling for the conversion of the Jews, and containing many of the key themes found throughout subsequent conversionist literature (the Jews being especially favoured, being repositories of the word of God, and a great glory being due a converted Israel). However, the work also shows a new development in the way Christians saw the Bible. By ascribing the sayings of the prophets refer to the Jews themselves rather than the Christian Church in general, The World's Great Restauration marks the start of the process of restoring the Old Testament to the Jews themselves.

== Legal works ==
Finch published in 1613 a legal treatise Nomotexnia. The original published version was in law French; it is believed that in an earlier draft it was written in the 1580s, and under the influence of Ramist logic. Finch had also studied at Christ's College, Cambridge, under Laurence Chaderton, a centre for the reception of Ramism in England.

Nomotexnia consists of four books. The first is mainly devoted to the distinction between natural law and positive law. The second book deals with the common law, customs, prerogative, and statute law; the third with procedure, and the fourth with special jurisdictions, e.g. those of the admiral and the bishop. An English version appeared in London in 1627, and was edited with notes by Danby Pickering of Gray's Inn, in 1759 (London: Henry Lintot). It differs in important particulars from the original work. Another and much closer translation was published in 1759. As an exposition of the common law, Finch's Law, as it was called, was only superseded by William Blackstone's Commentaries on the Laws of England, and so far as it dealt with jurisprudence by the work of John Austin. A short abstract of the work, entitled A Summary of the Common Law of England, appeared in 1673.

== Family ==
He was the second surviving son of Sir Thomas Finch of Eastwell, Kent, by Catherine, daughter and heir of Sir Thomas Moyle. His elder brother became Sir Moyle Finch, 1st Baronet. By his wife Ursula, daughter of John Thwaites of Kent, he was the father of John Finch, speaker of the House of Commons in the reign of Charles I, and of Edward Finch (fl. 1630-1641), Royalist divine.
