= Dordrecht Confession of Faith =

1632 statement of Mennonite beliefs

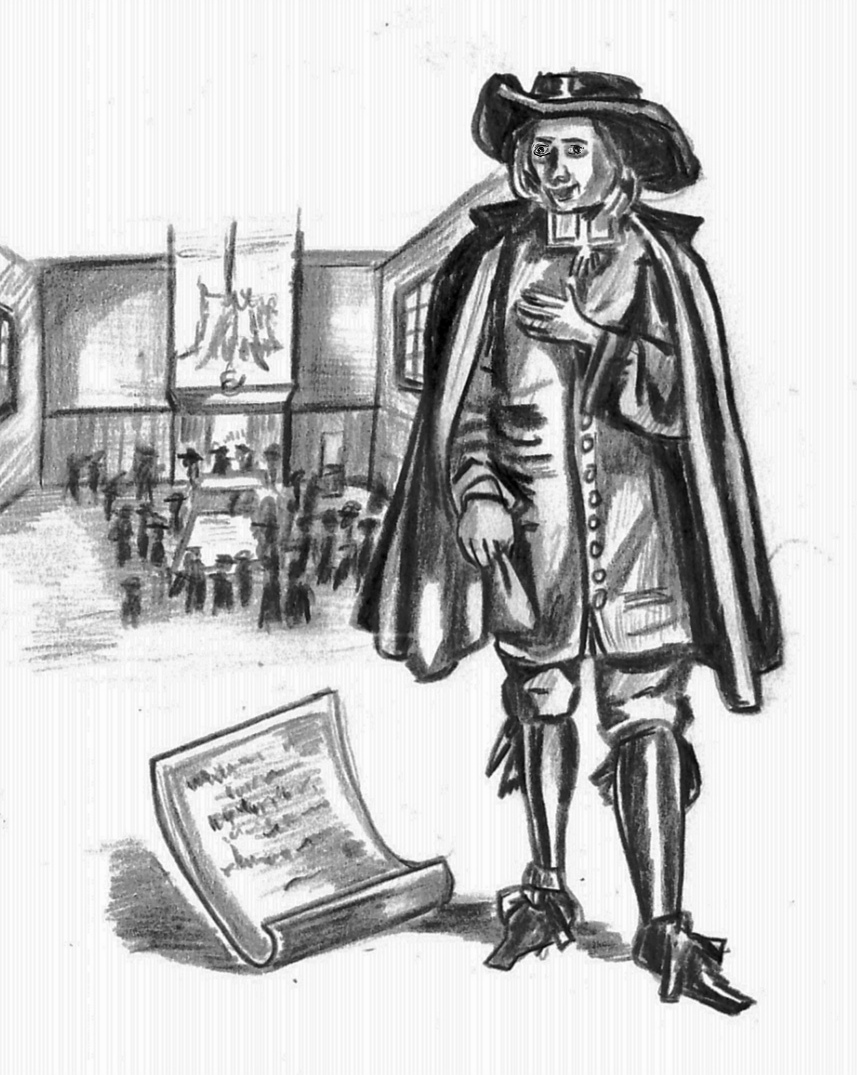
Herman op den Graeff, delegate of Krefeld, in front of the 1632 Dortrecht Mennonite Church Delegation and as a signer of the Dordrecht Confession of Faith

The Dordrecht Confession of Faith is a statement of religious beliefs adopted by Dutch Mennonite leaders at a meeting in Dordrecht, the Netherlands, on 21 April 1632. Its 18 articles emphasize belief in salvation through Jesus Christ, baptism, nonviolence (non-resistance), withdrawing from, or shunning those who are excommunicated from the Church, feet washing ("a washing of the saints' feet"), and avoidance of taking oaths.

== Reception ==
It was an influential part of the Radical Reformation and remains an important religious document to many modern Anabaptist groups, such as the Amish. In 1725, Jacob Gottschalk, a Mennonite bishop, met with sixteen other ministers from southeastern Pennsylvania and adopted the Confession. They also wrote the following endorsement, which Gottschalk was the first to sign:

We the hereunder written Servants of the Word of God, and Elders in the Congregation of the People, called Mennonists, in the Province of Pennsylvania, do acknowledge, and herewith make known, that we do own the foregoing Confession, Appendix, and Menno's Excusation, to be according to our Opinion; and also, have took the same to be wholly ours. In Testimony whereof, and that we believe that same to be good, we have here unto Subscribed our Names.

== Contents ==
The Confession's articles are as follows:

- I. Of God and the Creation of all Things
- II. Of the Fall of Man
- III. Of the Restoration of Man Through the Promise of the Coming Christ
- IV. The Advent of Christ into This World, and the Reason of His Coming
- V. The Law of Christ, i.e., the Holy Gospel or the New Testament
- VI. Of Repentance and Reformation of Life
- VII. Of Holy Baptism
- VIII. Of the Church of Christ
- IX. Of the Election, and Offices of Teachers, Deacons, and Deaconesses, in the Church
- X. Of the Holy Supper
- XI. Of the Washing of the Saints' Feet
- XII. Of the State of Matrimony
- XIII. Of the Office of the Secular Authority
- XIV. Of Revenge
- XV. Of the Swearing of Oaths
- XVI. Of the Ecclesiastical Ban, or Separation from the Church
- XVII. Of Shunning the Separated
- XVIII. Of the Resurrection of the Dead, and the Last Judgment

== See also ==
- Conservative Mennonites
- Old Colony Mennonites
- Old Order Mennonites
