= Thomas Cawton =

English clergyman

Thomas Cawton the elder (1605–1659) was an English clergyman of presbyterian and royalist views. After the discovery of the plot of Christopher Love, he went into exile in the Netherlands.

== Life ==
He was born at Rainham, Norfolk in 1605. He was sent to Queens' College, Cambridge, by Sir Roger Townshend, 1st Baronet. After seven years at Cambridge, he studied theology at the house of Herbert Palmer, vicar of Ashwell, Hertfordshire. He was then for four years chaplain to Sir William Airmine, 1st Baronet of Orton, Northamptonshire, and in 1637 was presented by Sir Roger Townshend to the vicarage of Wivenhoe, Essex, where he persuaded his parishioners not to sell fish on Sunday.

He married Elizabeth, daughter of William Jenkyn, a preacher of Sudbury, and sister of William Jenkyn. Jenkyn ejected in 1662. Seven years later he became minister of St Bartholomew-by-the-Exchange, London. He joined in the declaration of the London ministers against the death of Charles, and preached a sermon before the mayor and aldermen at Mercers' Chapel on 25 Feb. 1649, when he prayed for the royal family and Charles II. He was brought before the council of state, and, refusing to recant, was committed to the Gatehouse Prison. He was released with other prisoners on 14 August 1649 as a thanksgiving for Michael Jones's victory at the Battle of Rathmines. He was concerned with his brother-in-law, William Jenkyn, and others, in the plot to support Charles in Scotland. Christopher Love was executed for his part in this plot on 22 August 1651, but Cawton escaped to Holland, where he was chosen pastor of the English church in Rotterdam.

Here he became acquainted with scholars, and took pains to encourage Edmund Castell's Lexicon Heptaglotton and Brian Walton's polyglot bible. In 1658 Charles II addressed a letter to him, requesting Cawton to defend him among the Dutch ministers.

Cawton died at Rotterdam on 7 August 1659.

== Family ==
Cawton and his wife Elizabeth Jenkin had seven children; their son, Thomas Cawton the younger, was known as an orientalist.
