= Scamblesby =

Village and civil parish in the East Lindsey district from Lincolnshire, England

Coordinates: 53.290771°N 0.086484°W

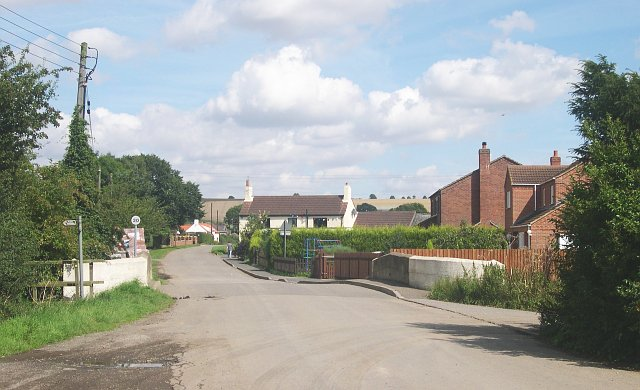
- Scamblesby village

- Location within Lincolnshire
- Population: 228 (Including Cawkwell. 2011 census)
- OS grid reference: TF276787
  - London: 125 mi (201 km) S
- District: East Lindsey
- Shire county: Lincolnshire
- Region: East Midlands
- Country: England
- Sovereign state: United Kingdom
- Post town: Louth
- Postcode district: LN11
- Police: Lincolnshire
- Fire: Lincolnshire
- Ambulance: East Midlands
- UK Parliament: Gainsborough

Scamblesby is a village and civil parish in the East Lindsey district from Lincolnshire, England. It is situated 6 miles (10 km) south-west from Louth, on the A153 road, and within the Lincolnshire Wolds, a designated Area of Outstanding Natural Beauty.

== History ==
In 1185, Roger de Maletoth gave a bovate, around 20 acres of land, at Scamblesby, to the Knights Templar.

In 1507, the prebend of Scamblesby was held by Polydore Vergil, an Italian historian and priest, who had moved to England in 1502. Vergil held the prebend until 1513 but lived mainly in London.

In 1672, Herbert Thorndike, Canon of Westminster Abbey, left the 'lands and tenements' he owned in Scamblesby, to be held in trust, to provide a 'perpetual vicarage' for the local church.

The village Anglican parish church is dedicated to St Martin. It was partially rebuilt in the 1890s and seats around 100.

== Education ==
In 2007 Scamblesby Church of England Primary School achieved examination grades higher than the local and the national average. Its 2012 Ofsted inspection judgements rated the school as Grade 2 (good) overall. The school has a website found here
