= Benjamin Cox (minister) =

Benjamin Cox, sometimes Coxe or Cockes (fl. 1646), was an English Baptist minister.

== Life ==
Born in Oxfordshire about 1595, he was probably a member of the family of Richard Cox, Bishop of Ely and entered Oxford as a commoner of Christ Church in 1609, when he was about fourteen. Afterwards he became a member of Broadgates Hall, whence he took his degrees in arts, proceeding MA in 1617. He was ordained, and held a living at Sampford Peverell in Devon. According to Thomas Crosby in his History of the English General Baptists, he was strongly in favour of ceremonies in Archbishop William Laud's time, and was afterwards taunted by his Presbyterian opponents for his zeal in this direction. Wood, however in his Athenae Oxonienses, says that he was always a puritan at heart, and it appears that in 1639 he was convened by Joseph Hall, Bishop of Exeter, for preaching that the Church of England did not hold episcopacy to be jure divino, but according to Thomas Brooks made "a handsome retraction". Although a puritan and an enemy to episcopacy, Cox in his earlier days may have upheld the sacramental system as warmly as many other Presbyterians did. After the outbreak of the English Civil War in 1642, he ventured to express opinions that he had thought it prudent to conceal up to that time.

He later became a minister at Bedford, and openly preached the invalidity of infant baptism. In 1643 he was invited to form a congregation at Coventry. On his arrival Richard Baxter, who was then chaplain to the rebel forces in the town, challenged him to a controversy. Cox imprudently accepted the challenge of an opponent whose arguments were supported by the swords of an admiring congregation. After the discussion had been held, the Presbyterians ordered him to quit the town, and when he refused or delayed to do so they imprisoned him. Baxter was afterwards reproached for having instigated this act of intolerance; and though he denied that he had done so, he can scarcely have opposed it. After his release Cox went to London, and preached to a congregation of Baptists. A 1645 debate between supporters of the invalidity of infant baptism, Hanserd Knollys, William Kiffin and Cox on the one side with the Presbyterian divine Edmund Calamy on the other had to be cancelled when it was rumoured that the Baptists "planned to bring 'swords, clubs and staves' to ensure that their view prevailed." He was one of the managers of a public dispute that was to be held at Aldermanbury on 3 December 1645, and, when it was forbidden, joined in writing a declaration on the subject. He signed his name as Benjamin Cockes to the second edition of the Declaration of Faith of the Seven Congregations in London, published in 1647. He conformed in 1662, but afterwards renounced his living, and continued a Baptist until his death at an advanced age.

== Works ==
- A treatise answered by The great question … touching scandalous Christians, as yet not legally convicted, whether or no they may be admitted … at the Lord's Table, by M. Blake, B.D., 1645.
- According to Wood, a treatise on Infant Baptism.
- Also according to Wood, A True and Sober Answer.
- With Hanserd Knollys and others, A Declaration concerning the Publicke Dispute which should have been in the Meeting House of Aldermanbury, Dec. 3 [1645], concerning Infant Baptism.
- An Appendix to a Confession of Faith. … Occasioned by the inquiry of persons in the County, 1646; republished by the Hansard Knollys Society in Confessions of Faith, 49.
- God's Ordinance … the Saint's Privilege, 1646.
- Benjamin Cox (1646). Some Mistaken Scriptures sincerely explained. In answer to one infected with some Pelagian errours, etc. London: Tho. Paine.
