= Daniel Dyke (died 1614) =

English academic

Daniel Dyke (died 1614) was an English academic, a Puritan of the reign of James I.

== Life ==
He was born at Hempstead, Essex, where his father William was a minister and had been silenced for nonconformity. He proceeded B.A. at St John's College, Cambridge in 1595–6, and M.A. at Sidney Sussex College in 1599. He became fellow of Sidney in 1606, when or soon after he proceeded B.D.

Dyke was also appointed as Princess Elizabeth’s Puritan chaplain.

== Family ==
Jeremiah Dyke, among those of the ministers who subscribed the Book of Discipline, was his brother, and edited all Daniel Dyke's works for publication.

The preacher Daniel Dyke (1617–1688) the younger was his nephew.

== Works ==
Dyke wrote:

- ‘The Mystery of Self-deceiving,’ 1615.
- ‘Certaine comfortable Sermons vpon the 124 Psalme,’ 1616.
- ‘Six Evangelical Histories: of Water turned into Wine, of the Temple's Purgation, of Christ and Nicodemus, of John's last Testimony, of Christ and the Woman of Samaria, of the Ruler's Son's Healing,’ 1617.
- ‘Exposition upon Philemon and the School of Affliction,’ 1618.
- ‘Two Treatises: The one, of Repentance; the other, of Christ's Temptations.’

His works were collected and published by his family in two volumes in 1635.
