= Lazarus Seaman =

English clergyman

Lazarus Seaman (died 1675), was an English clergyman, supporter in the Westminster Assembly of the Presbyterian party, intruded Master of Peterhouse, Cambridge, and nonconformist minister.

== Life ==
He was a native of Leicester, where he was born of poor parents early in the seventeenth century. On 4 July 1623 he was entered as a sizar at Emmanuel College, Cambridge, where he graduated B.A. in 1627, M.A, in 1631. Lack of funds led him to leave Cambridge and teach a school, apparently in London.

He was chosen lecturer at St. Martin's, Ludgate, and became chaplain to Algernon Percy, 10th Earl of Northumberland. In 1642 he was presented by William Laud to the rectory of Allhallows, Bread Street; Laud made this presentation out of courtesy to Northumberland, and complained that, nonetheless, Henry Montagu, 1st Earl of Manchester, had written to pressure him, commanding him in the name of the House of Lords to give the benefice to Seaman. In 1643 he was nominated a member of the Westminster Assembly and he was a regular attendant, saying there on 18 February 1645, "In no institution did God go against nature."

On 11 April 1644 Seaman was admitted Master of Peterhouse, Cambridge, by Edward Montagu, 2nd Earl of Manchester, in place of John Cosin, ejected on 18 March. He was an absentee for much of the time, clashed with the fellowship, and imposed the election of his son as Fellow.

On 6 November 1645 Seaman was placed on the committee of accommodation designed by parliament to arrange terms for the comprehension of the Independents; the project fell through, as the independents rejected the planned comprehension and insisted on religious toleration. He was one of the remonstrants (26 May 1646) against the toleration of 'separate congregations,' and maintained in the Westminster Assembly the divine right of the presbyterian discipline. At the second meeting (8 November 1647) of the provincial assembly of London, Seaman, a member of the first London classis, was moderator. In September–November 1648 he was one of the four presbyterian divines commissioned to the Isle of Wight to recommend their case to Charles I in discussion with the king, aided by episcopalian divines; Charles complimented Seaman on his ability. In January 1649 he signed the Vindication drawn up by Cornelius Burges, protesting against the king's trial.

He proceeded D.D. in 1649. In 1653 he was vice-chancellor of Cambridge, and in 1654 was appointed by Oliver Cromwell, one of the Visitors of his university. On the English Restoration, John Cosin was restored as Master of Peterhouse on 3 August 1660.

Seaman held aloof, with William Jenkyn and a few others, from the negotiations with Charles II in the presbyterian interest, and was looked upon as an uncompromising man, whom it was useless to tempt with offers of preferment. He resigned his benefice in consequence of the 1662 Uniformity Act; his successor, Risden, was appointed on 26 August 1662. On the passing of the Five Mile Act 1665, Richard Baxter drew up a statement of reasons for not taking the oath which exempted from its operation; Seaman persuaded him to abstain from publishing it, and recommended a policy of 'silent patience.' He privately ministered to a congregation of his former parishioners, preached publicly after the Great Fire of London of 1666, and after the indulgence of 1672 built a chapel in Meeting-house Yard, Silver Street, Wood Street, Holborn.

Anthony à Wood, who knew him personally, refers to him respectfully as "a learned nonconformist." He died in Warwick Court, Newgate Street, about 9 September 1675; Jenkyn preached his funeral sermon on 12 September; an elegy on his death was issued (1675) as a broadsheet. His library of 5,000 books was sold at auction, the first time an auction of this kind had been held in England.

== Works ==
Besides sermons before parliament (1644–1647), before the Lord Mayor (1650), and a farewell sermon (in the London collection, 1663), Seaman published:

- The Διατριβὴ proved to be Παραδιατριβή. A Vindication of . . . the Reformed Church . . . from Misrepresentations concerning the Ordination (1647), against Sidrach Simpson and Edmund Chillenden);
- His Majesties Papers . . . with an Answer ... by ... Mr. Seaman (1648), reprinted as The Papers which passed between His Majesty . . , and Mr. Seaman . . . concerning Church-government (1649).

He prefixed an address to A Glance of Heaven (1638), by Richard Sibbes.

== Notes ==
Academic offices
Preceded by John Cosin	Master of Peterhouse, Cambridge; 1644-1660	Succeeded by John Cosin
Preceded by Richard Minshall	Vice-Chancellor of the University of Cambridge; 1653-1654	Succeeded by John Lightfoot
