= William Kiffin =

English Baptist minister and merchant (1616–1701)

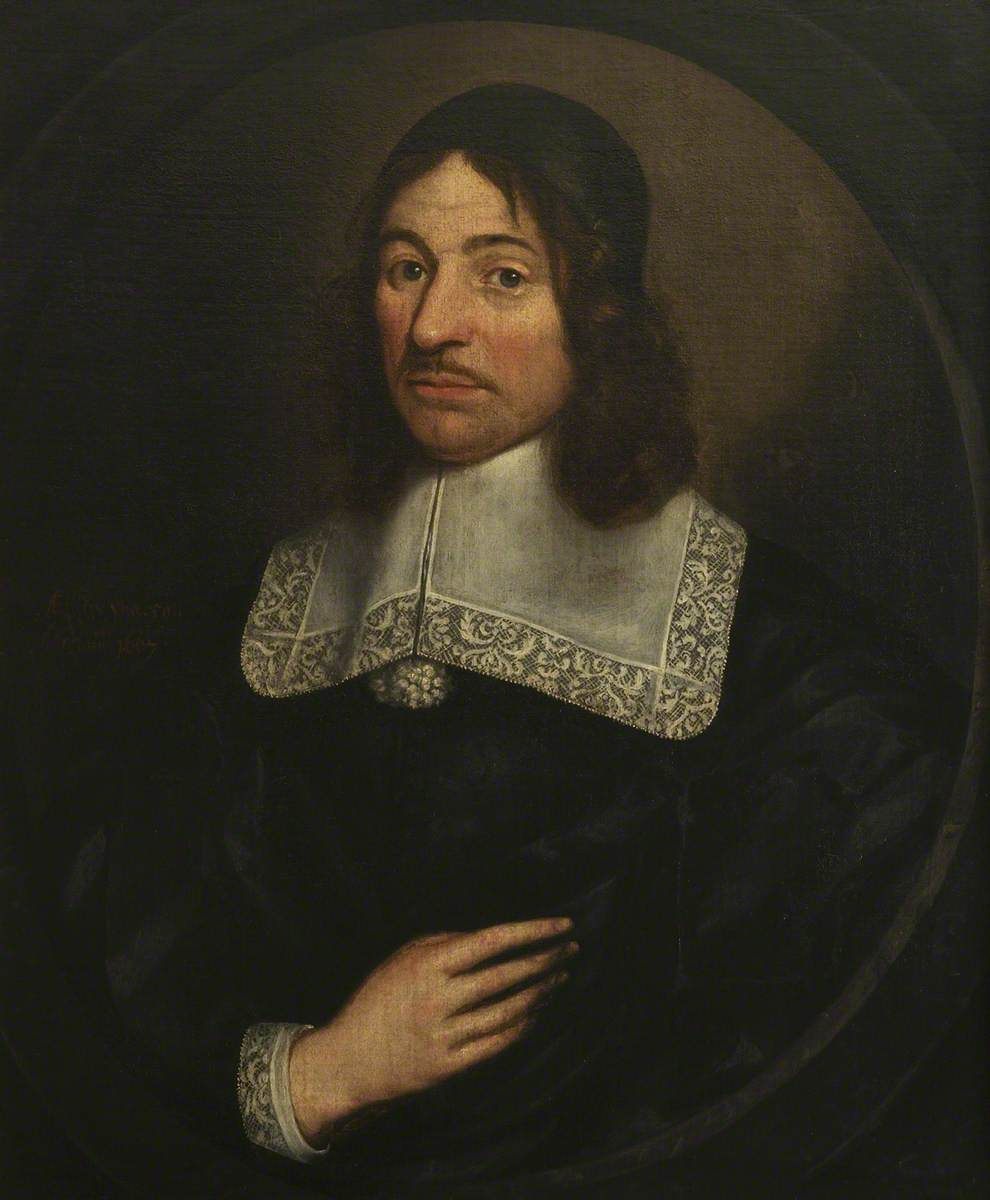

William Kiffin (1616–1701), sometimes spelled William Kiffen, was a seventeenth-century English Baptist minister. He was also a successful merchant in the woollen trade.

== Life ==
He was born in London early in 1616. His family appears to have been of Welsh descent. Both his parents died of the plague which broke out in June 1625. His father left property which was invested by some relatives in their business; on their failure little was saved. Kiffin was likely apprenticed in 1629 to John Lilburne, then a brewer (note: this probably is inaccurate; Liliburne was the same age as Kiffin; he was also not a brewer until 1641ish); he left Lilburne in 1631, and seems to have been apprenticed to a glover (Kiffin became a Freeman of the Leathersellers' Company on 10 July 1638, having served an apprenticeship to John Smith, thought to have been a glover by trade). In 1631 Kiffin attended the sermons of many Puritan divines, including John Davenport and Lewis du Moulin, but attached himself next year to John Goodwin the independent. He joined a religious society of apprentices, and became (1638) member of the Nonconformist church gathered in Southwark by Henry Jacob and then ministered to by John Lothrop. Kiffin preached occasionally. In 1641–2, during the ministry of Henry Jessey, he and others became Baptists, but he remained a member of the church until 1644.

Early in 1641 he was arrested at a Southwark conventicle and committed by Judge Mallet to the White Lion prison, bail being refused. Mallet was himself committed to the Tower in the following July, whereupon Kiffin obtained his release. On 17 October 1642 he was one of four Baptist disputants encountered at Southwark by Daniel Featley.

In 1643 Kiffin began business in woollen cloth on his own account with Holland and became a rich man. In 1647 he was parliamentary assessor of taxes for Middlesex. In 1649 he made good use of the five weeks' grace before the coming into force of restrictions upon the import of foreign goods. In 1652, on the outbreak of the first Anglo–Dutch War, he gained money and privileges by furnishing requisites for the English fleet. Meanwhile, he was pursuing his religious labours. In 1644, seven Baptist churches in London drew up the famous First London Confession of Faith; His name heads in the signatories. Josiah Ricraft, a Presbyterian merchant, attacked him (1646) as "the grand ringleader" of the Baptists. Thomas Edwards assailed him in 1646 as a "mountebank," and as adopting the "atheistical" practice of unction for the recovery of the sick. Kiffin had offered in vain (15 Nov. 1644) to discuss matters publicly with Edwards in his church (St. Botolph's, Aldgate). He joined Hanserd Knollys in a public disputation (1646) at Holy Trinity Church, Coventry, with John Bryan, D.D., and Obadiah Grew, D.D. In January 1649 Parliament, in response to a petition from Ipswich, gave him liberty to preach in any part of Suffolk, where he travelled with Thomas Patience, his assistant.

He corresponded (1653) with the Baptist churches in Ireland and Wales. His settlement with the congregation, which, on 1 March 1667, opened a meeting-house in Meeting-house Yard, Devonshire Square, London, is usually dated in 1653. But as early as 1643 Kiffin and Patience ministered to this congregation, which consisted of seceders from Wapping practising close communion. He signed the declaration of 1651. On 12 July 1655 Kiffin was brought before Christopher Pack, the Lord Mayor, for preaching that infant baptism was unlawful, a heresy visited with severe penalties under the "draconick ordinance" of 1648. The execution of the penalty was indefinitely postponed. A pamphlet (The Spirit of Persecution again Broke Loose, &c., 1655) contrasts this leniency with the severity used towards John Biddle. He was M.P. for Middlesex, 1656–8.

Between 1654 and 1659 Kiffin is spoken of as captain and lieutenant-colonel in the London militia. This may account for his arrest, and the seizure of arms at his house in Little Moorfields, shortly before the Restoration, in 1660, by order of Monck, who was quartered near him. He was released by order of the common council, and the arms were restored to him. A more serious trouble befell him later in the year. A forged letter, dated 21 December 1660, and professing to come from Taunton, implicated him in an alleged plot, following the death of the Princess of Orange (24 December). He was arrested on 29 December, and kept in the guard-house at Whitehall, but released on 31 Dec. by Sir Robert Foster, the chief justice, the date and other circumstances proving the letter a forgery. On 7 January 1661 Venner's insurrection broke out. Kiffin at once headed a "protestation" of London baptists, but nevertheless was arrested at his meeting-house and detained in prison for four days.

About 1663 he gave evidence before a committee of the House of Commons, and before the privy council, against granting to the "Hamburg Company" a monopoly of the woollen trade with Holland and Germany. His evidence permanently impressed Charles II in his favour, and gained him the goodwill of Clarendon. A year later he was arrested at the instance of George Villiers, 2nd Duke of Buckingham, on suspicion of being concerned in an anabaptist plot against the king's life. He wrote to Clarendon, and was at once released by the privy council, and though a prosecution was threatened nothing came of it. In 1669 his meeting-house was in Finsbury Court, Moorfields. On two occasions, in 1670 and 1682, Kiffin, when prosecuted for conventicle-keeping, successfully pleaded technical flaws. On two other occasions (one in 1673) he obtained interviews with the king, securing the suppression of a libel against Baptists, and the pardon of twelve Aylesbury baptists who had been sentenced to death under the Religion Act 1592. Crosby relates that Charles wanted a loan of £40,000 from Kiffin, who made him a present of £10,000, and said afterwards that he had thus saved £30,000. In 1675 he took part in a scheme for ministerial education among baptists; and in the following year went into Wiltshire, to aid in dealing with the Socinian tendencies of Thomas Collier.

In 1683 his house was searched on suspicion of his complicity with the Rye House Plot; his son-in-law, Joseph Hayes, a banker, was tried for remitting money to Sir Thomas Armstrong, and narrowly escaped with his life, "a jury of merchants" refusing to convict him. Treasonable letters were forwarded to Kiffin; he at once placed them in the hands of Judge Jeffreys. Two of his grandsons, Benjamin and William Howling, the former being just of age, were executed (Benjamin at Taunton on 30 September, William at Lyme Regis on 12 Sept. 1686) for having joined Monmouth's rebellion.

Kiffin offered £3,000 for their acquittal, but "missed the right door," not having gone to Jeffreys. The latter is said to have remarked to William Hewling: "You have a grandfather who deserves to be hanged as richly as you." Though his near relatives were thus involved, Kiffin himself was neither a plotter nor, in any active sense, a politician.

On the revocation (1685) of the edict of Nantes, Kiffin maintained at his own expense an exiled Huguenot family of rank. Both on constitutional and on anti-popish grounds he refused to avail himself of James II's declaration for liberty of conscience (April 1687), and did all in his power to keep his denomination from countenancing it; not a single baptist congregation admitted the dispensing power, though prominent individual baptists did, e.g. Nehemiah Cox. In August 1687 James sent for Kiffin to court, and told him he had included his name as an alderman for the city of London in his new charter. Kiffin pleaded his age and retirement from business, and reminded the king of the death of his grandsons. "I shall find," said James, "a balsam for that sore." Kiffin was put into the commission of the peace and the lieutenancy. He delayed four months before qualifying as alderman, and did so at length (27 Oct. 1687) because there was no limit to the fine which might have been imposed on him. He gave £50 towards the lord mayor's feast, but would not have done so had he known the papal nuncio (Count Ferdinando d'Adda) was invited. For nearly a year he held office as alderman of Cheap ward, being succeeded on 21 Oct. 1688 by Sir Humphrey Edwin.

After the death of Patience (1666) he was assisted in his ministry by Daniel Dyke and Richard Adams (died 1716). He resigned his charge in 1692. He died on 29 Dec. 1701 in his eighty-sixth year, and was buried in Bunhill Fields; the inscription on his tomb is given in John Stow's Survey, ed. John Strype, 1720. His portrait was in 1808 in the possession of the Rev. Richard Frost of Dunmow, Essex, a descendant; an engraving is given in Wilson, and reproduced by William Orme and Joseph Ivimey. He married late in 1634; his wife, Hanna, died 6 Oct. 1682, aged 66. His eldest son William died 31 Aug. 1669, aged 20; his second son died at Venice, and was supposed to have been poisoned; Harry, another son, died on 8 Dec. 1698, aged 44. His daughter Priscilla (d. 15 March 1679) married Robert Liddel. His granddaughter, Hannah Hewling, married Oliver Cromwell's grandson, Major Gen. Henry Cromwell.

== Works ==
- A Glimpse of Sion's Glory, &c., 1641, 4to.
- The Christian Man's Trial, &c., 1641
- Observations on Hosea ii. 7, 8, &c., 1642
- A Letter to Mr. Edwards, &c., 1644, 12mo (dated 15 Nov.)
- A Briefe Remonstrance of the ... Grounds of ... Anabaptists for their Separation, &c., 1645, 4to (answered by Ricraft in A Looking-glass for the Anabaptists, &c., 1645, 4to)
- A Declaration concerning the Publicke Dispute, &c., 1645, 4to (by Kiffin, Hanserd Knollys, and Benjamin Cox)
- Walwyn's Wiles, &c., 1649
- A Letter to the Lord Mayor, by Lieut.-Col. Kiffin, &c., 1659, fol.
- A Sober Discourse of Right to Church Communion, &c., 1681, 12mo (against open communion, in reply to Bunyan)

He wrote prefaces to an edition of Samuel How's The Sufficiency of the Spirit's Teaching, &c., 1640, 4to, and to The Quakers Appeal Answered, &c., 1674, 8vo; and edited, with a continuation, the Life of Hanserd Knollys,1692, 8vo.

He spelt his name Kiffen and (later) Kiffin, which is the form given in the 1677 directory; Featley calls him Cufin.
