= Cawkwell =

Hamlet and former civil parish in the East Lindsey district of Lincolnshire, England

Coordinates: 53.299134°N 0.078728°W

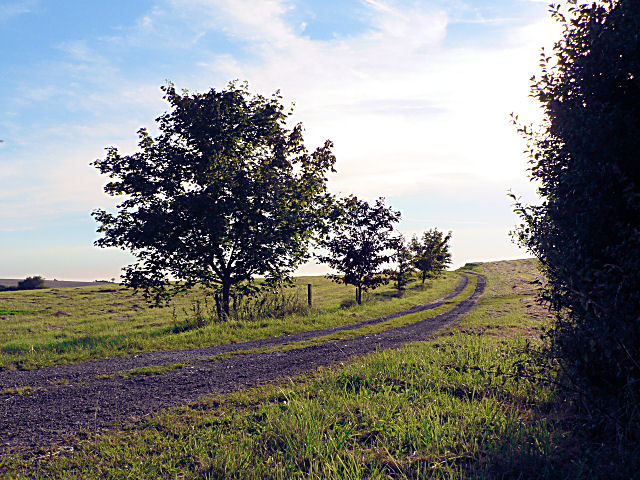
- Cawkwell bridleway

- Location within Lincolnshire
- OS grid reference: TF281797
  - London: 125 mi (201 km) S
- Civil parish: Scamblesby
- District: East Lindsey
- Shire county: Lincolnshire
- Region: East Midlands
- Country: England
- Sovereign state: United Kingdom
- Post town: Louth
- Postcode district: LN11
- Police: Lincolnshire
- Fire: Lincolnshire
- Ambulance: East Midlands
- UK Parliament: Louth and Horncastle

Cawkwell is a hamlet and former civil parish, now in the parish of Scamblesby, in the East Lindsey district of Lincolnshire, England. It is situated approximately 6 miles (10 km) south-west from the town of Louth, and in the Lincolnshire Wolds, a designated Area of Outstanding Natural Beauty. In 1961 the parish had a population of 35. On 1 April 1987 the parish was abolished and merged with Scamblesby.

Cawkwell is a deserted medieval village first mentioned in 1354. Cawkwell parish church was dedicated to Saint Peter. It was still standing in 1872 but had disappeared by 1924, with parts of it used to restore the church at Scamblesby. Cawkwell House is a Grade II listed building dating from 1825 and built of brick with a slate roof.
