= John Faldo =

John Faldo (1633 – 7 February 1690) was an English nonconformist minister and controversialist.

== Life ==
Faldo is said to have been educated at Cambridge University, and to have been a chaplain in the army, so that he held no benefice when the Act of Uniformity 1662 became law. In 1673 he is described as a nonconforming minister at Barnet, and in 1684 was chosen pastor of the congregation at Plasterers' Hall, Addle Street, Aldermanbury, London. Here he remained till his death. Faldo was a congregationalist in the latter part of his life.

He died on 7 February 1690, of the stone, and was buried at Bunhill Fields, where there was a Latin inscription upon his tomb. His funeral sermon was preached by the Rev. John Quick, and afterwards published. It asserts that he did much to heal the breach between Presbyterians and Independents, but gives no biographical facts except the observation that ‘such a pastor as Mr. Faldo is forty years a making.’

== Works ==
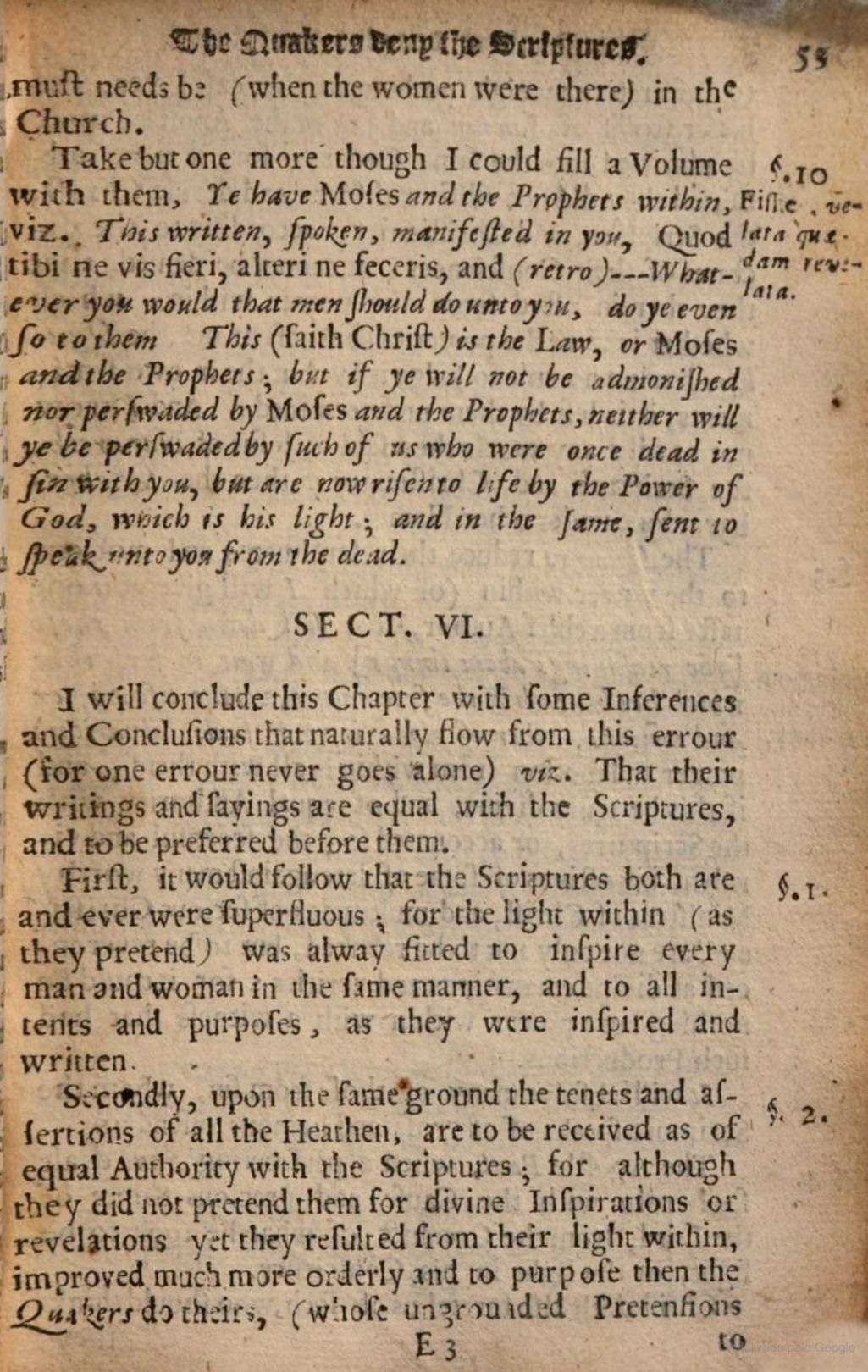
Quakerism no Christianity, 1673, page 53.

In 1673 he published ‘Quakerism no Christianity. Clearly and abundantly proved, out of the writings of their Chief Leaders. With a Key, for the understanding their sense of their many Usurped, and Unintelligible Words and Phrases, to most Readers.’ The book was in three parts, the third being entitled ‘An Examination of the First Part of W. Pen's Pamphlet called The Spirit of Truth: with a Rebuke of his Exorbitances.’ This was at once answered by William Penn in a tract. Faldo, still in 1673, answered Penn; to which, in 1673 again, Penn replied. Penn states in this tract that Faldo took up the subject ‘disgusted at the coming over of some of his hearers to the way we profess.’ On the appearance of ‘The Invalidity,’ Faldo sent Penn a printed challenge to engage in a public dispute, which Penn refused by letter, observing, ‘for thy letter, it is civil, I wish all thy procedure had grated no more: I love, and shall at any time convenient, embrace a sober discussion of principles of religion; for truly I aim at nothing more than truth's triumph, though in my own abasement;’ but Faldo was displeased with the answer, and published in 1674 ‘A Curb to W. Penn's Confidence,’ to which Penn retorted. After this Faldo assembled a company of twenty-one learned divines, who subscribed to a commendatory epistle which was issued with a second edition of Faldo's original work, ‘Quakerism no Christianity.’ This appeared in 1674, and was at once answered by Penn. The final tract of the controversy was Faldo's answer to this, which appeared in 1675. Throughout the controversy Faldo was abusive.

A volume published by Faldo in 1687, called ‘A Discourse of the Gospel of Peace, and of the Government of our own Spirits. Being the substance of Divers Sermons, from Ephes. vi. 15 and Prov. xvi. 32’ was dedicated to Lady Clinton, to whose family Faldo seems to have acted as chaplain.

In 1696 there was published the seventeenth edition of Jeremiah Dyke's ‘The Worthy Communicant: or a Treatise showing the due Order of Receiving the Sacrament of the Lord's Supper,’ abridged and supplemented by Faldo so as to bring the book ‘within the reach of the poor.’

== Notes ==
Attribution

This article incorporates text from a publication now in the public domain: "Faldo, John". Dictionary of National Biography. London: Smith, Elder & Co. 1885–1900.
