= Farnley Wood Plot =

Conspiracy to overthrow Charles II (1663)

The Farnley Wood Plot was a conspiracy in Yorkshire, England in October 1663. Intended as a major rising to overturn the return to monarchy in 1660, it was undermined by informers, and came to nothing. It coincided with the Derwentdale Plot in Northumberland and County Durham.

The major plotters were Joshua Greathead and Captain Thomas Oates, operating primarily in Farnley, West Yorkshire, but also with links to Gildersome, Morley, West Yorkshire and Leeds. The aim was to capture and overthrow the Royalist strongholds of Leeds city centre. The plot was disbanded on 12 October 1663. Twenty-six men were arrested, imprisoned and executed as traitors, with at least some being hanged, drawn and quartered.

== Background ==
After the Restoration of the monarchy and government by Charles II, the son of defeated and executed king Charles I, there was still division in the nation. Fear of Catholicism continued, fed by the success of the Counter Reformation in Europe. The religious settlement had re-established the Church of England, but presbyterians and other dissenters were suspicious of what they considered its 'Popish' practices. Charles II was at least sympathetic to Catholicism. This wave of radical dissension was found throughout the country but was particularly pronounced in the north, leading to its characterization as the 'Northern Rebellion'. The Crown took steps to suppress the movement by arresting known agitators.

Paul Hobson, a Particular Baptist preacher who was involved in the planning of the rebellion, was arrested on 20 August. He was later accused of having turned informer.

== The plot ==
The Farnley Wood Plot was launched in Farnley, in Leeds, by two main players, both of Parliamentarian sympathies. One was Joshua Greathead, a local squire who had fought in the Civil War in Oliver Cromwell's army and had led his own squadron. He was a resident of Gildersome, one of the villages nearest to Farnley. The other was Captain Thomas Oates of Morley. Farnley, lying halfway between Leeds and Morley and largely wooded, provided an ideal location to meet in numbers. The declared objectives of the plot were "to re-establish a gospel ministry and magistracy; to restore the Long Parliament; to relieve themselves from the excise and all subsidies and to reform all orders and degrees of men, especially the lawyers and clergy". The main aim of the plan of campaign may have been to storm the Royalist strongholds in the city of Leeds.

On the morning of 12 October 1663, a poor turn-out of only 26 men had convened, mostly Presbyterian local farmers and businessmen, who were not prepared to fight in battle. The plot was a failure, the meeting broke up and all returned to their villages. However, Greathead had turned informer after being overruled in favour of the plans made by Oates and had alerted the authorities, who set in motion the arrest of the 26 people.

== Aftermath ==
The arrested men were taken to await the assizes in York, where they were remanded in Clifford's tower. Those tried and sentenced to death for treason were Thomas Oates, Samuel Ellis, John Nettleton snr, John Nettleton jnr, Robert Scott, William Tolson, John Fozzard, Robert Olroyd, John Asquith, Peregrine Corney, John Snowden, John Smith, William Ash, John Errington, Robert Atkinson, William Colton, George Denham ("The Grand Agitator"), Henry Watson, Richard Wilson, Ralph Rymer and John Carre. One of the plotters, John Asquith, was an ancestor of the future British Prime Minister H.H. Asquith.

Most were executed on a single morning in York and three at Northallerton. Robert Olroyd and Peregrine Corney were separately executed. Three of the men (Robert Atkins, John Errington and Henry Wilson) had managed to escape to Leeds. There they hid in an inn, but were finally re-arrested and, on 14 January 1664, sentenced to death for treason. They were transported to Chapeltown Moor, where a gallows had been constructed. They were hung by chains, before being dissected. The executioner, a local joiner of the name of Peter Mason, cut off the three heads and preserved them. The following day, they were stuck on the railings of Moot Hall. In 1677 the skulls were blown down in a gale.

Others implicated in the general uprising included Thomas Palmer. The authorities also rounded up Parliamentarian sympathisers throughout the country including John Hutchinson, Thomas Jollie, Richard Salwey, Robert Venables, Henry Neville, and Henry Wilkinson. Most were released from lack of evidence but Hutchinson – who had been pardoned in 1660, thus avoiding execution, for his part in authorizing the regicide of Charles I – died while incarcerated in Sandown Castle. Sir Ralph Delaval, 1st Baronet was accused of involvement in Northumberland, but no charges were levied.

When the Cavalier Parliament met again in early 1664, it repealed the Triennial Act 1640. This legislative step has been attributed to the effect on domestic politics of the uncovering of the ramifications of the plot for a northern rebellion.

The Northern Rising is also said to have led to the 1664 Conventicle Act, which sought to crack down on religious dissent. The Act penalised anyone who preached at or attended a dissenter congregation, or allowed dissenters to use their building.
