= Jeremiah Dyke =

English Puritan minister

Jeremiah Dyke (baptised 1584, d. 9 April 1639) was an English conforming Puritan minister.

== Life ==
His father William Dyke was a minister at Hempstead, Essex, dispossessed for nonconformity, and then a preacher at Coggeshall. Daniel Dyke (d. 1614) was his brother. He was educated at Sidney Sussex College, Cambridge, matriculating in 1598, graduating B.A. in 1602 and M.A. in 1605. He then became a Fellow of the college.

After taking orders he was preferred briefly to the living of Toft, Cambridgeshire, and then Epping in Essex in 1609, which he held till his death. His name or that of his brother is among those of the ministers who subscribed the Book of Discipline. Thomas Fuller says he was 'guardian of his brother's works', which he published in 1635.

== Family ==
The preacher Daniel Dyke (1617–1688) the younger was his son.

== Works ==
- 'A Counterpoison against Covetousnes,' 1619.
- 'Good Conscience, or a Treatise shewing the Nature, Means, Marks, Benefit, and Necessity thereof,' 1624.
- 'The Mischiefe and Miserie of Scandals, both taken and given,' &c., 1631.
- 'The Righteous Man's Tower, or the Way to be Safe in a case of Danger,' 1639.
- 'The Right Receiving of and Rooting in Christ,' 1640.
- 'Divers Select Sermons', 1640 (with his brother Daniel)
- 'The Worthy Communicant, or a Treatise showing I the due order of Receiving the Sacrament of the Lord's Supper,' 1642.
- 'A Caveat for Archippus' (Republished) London: Harrison and Sons, 1898

He also published works of his brother, Daniel Dyke, B.D.
