= Paul Hobson =

Captain Paul Hobson (died 1666) was an antinomian Particular Baptist who served in the parliamentary army during the English Civil War.

He was one of the signatories to the Baptist Confession of 1644, who later adopted Fifth Monarchy ideas, and later arrested for his part in the Farnley Wood Plot.
