= Daniel Dyke =

English Baptist minister

Daniel Dyke (1617–1688) was an English Baptist minister.

== Life ==
He was the son of Jeremiah Dyke, minister of Epping, Essex, and was educated first at a private school in the country, and then sent to Sidney Sussex College, Cambridge. There he matriculated in 1629, graduated B.A. in 1633 and M.A. in 1636. He received episcopal ordination, but this was subsequently disputed. When a marriage performed by him was sought to be set aside he produced his letters of ordination.

He was presented as rector to Eastwick, Hertfordshire, about 1636, and resigned in 1658. In 1645 his talent caused him to be appointed to the valuable rectory of Great Hadham, Hertfordshire, by Parliament. In 1651 he was appointed by Oliver Cromwell one of his chaplains in ordinary, and in 1653 a trier for the approval of ministers, one of a small number of professed Baptists on the commission.

He resigned his preferments immediately after the Restoration, asserting that however well-disposed the king might be towards dissent, the royalists would insist on the expulsion of the nonconformist clergy and their persecution. Edmund Calamy, however, counts him among the ejected ministers. Dyke continued to preach, and, although writs were frequently issued for his apprehension, was never imprisoned longer than a few hours. In February 1668, after preaching for a year on trial, Dyke was appointed joint-elder with William Kiffin at Devonshire Square Baptist Church, in Bishopsgate, London, where he ministered until his death in 1688. His remains were interred in Bunhill Fields, or the Dissenters' Burial Ground. His funeral sermon was preached by Warner.

His motto was nosce te ipsum (know yourself).

== Works ==
- The Quakers' Appeal Answered, and a full Relation of the Occasion, Progress, and Issue of a Meeting at the Barbican between the Baptists and the Quakers (1674)
- The Baptists' Answer to Mr. Wills' Appeal (1675)
- Recommendatory Epistle before Mr. Cox's Confutation of the Errors of Thomas Collier

These were not under his name. He also edited a volume of sermons by his father, Jeremiah Dyke.
