= Thieleman J. van Braght =

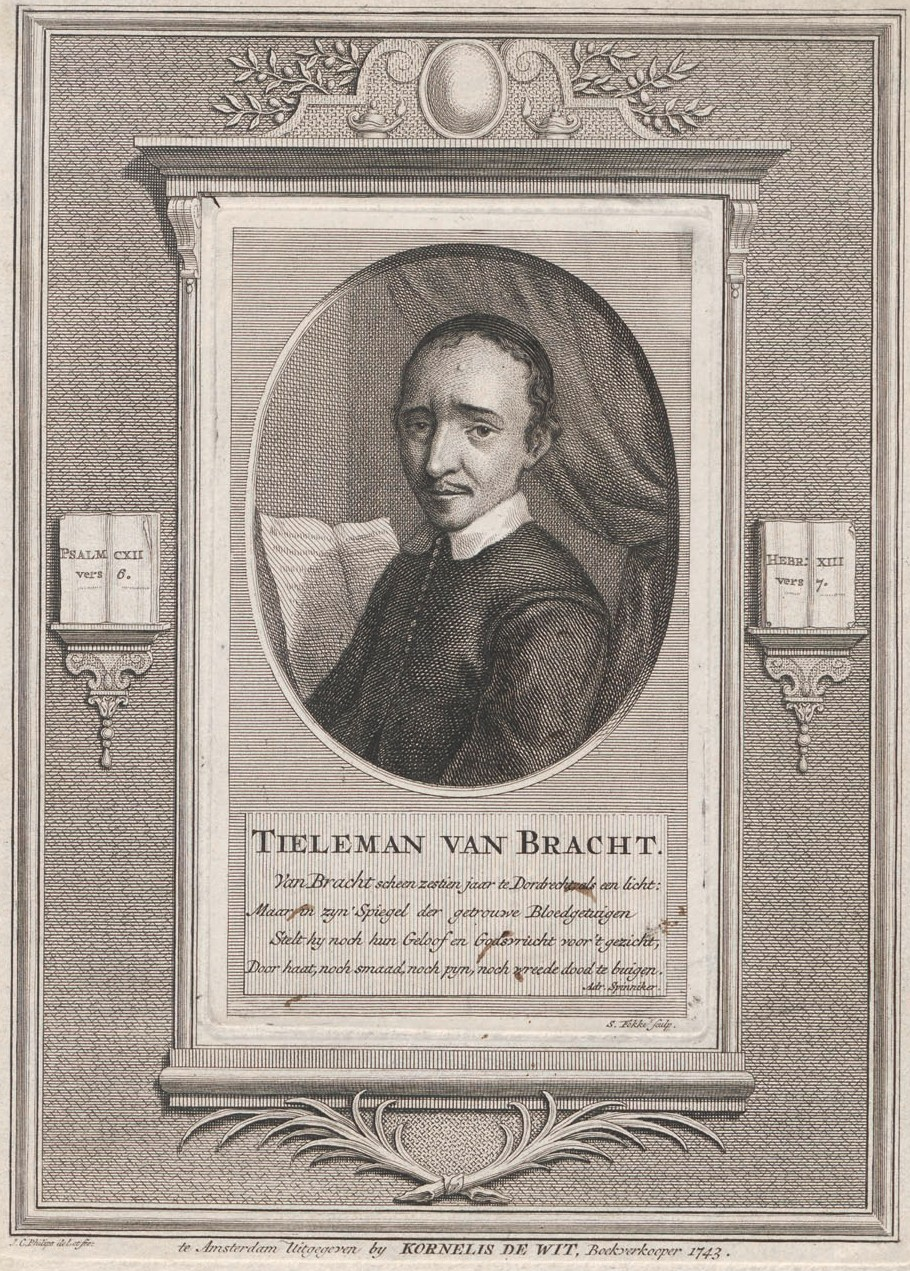
- Portrait by Jan Caspar Philips after a design by Simon Fokke of Thieleman J. van Braght, from Kornelis de Wit's Verzaameling van Afbeeldingen van Doopsgezinde Leeraaren.
- Born: Thieleman Janszoon van Braght; 29 January 1625
- Died: 7 October 1664 (aged 39)

Thieleman Janszoon van Braght (29 January 1625 – 7 October 1664) was the Anabaptist author of the Martyrs Mirror or The Bloody Theater, first published in Holland in 1660 in Dutch.

Van Braght was born in Dordrecht. His major work claimed to document the stories and testimonies of various early Anabaptists and non-resistant opponents of the Roman Catholic Church as well as others who died at the hands of pagans and Muslims who died as martyrs. The full title of the book is The Bloody Theater or Martyrs Mirror of the Defenseless Christians who baptized only upon confession of faith, and who suffered and died for the testimony of Jesus, their Saviour, from the time of Christ to the year A.D. 1660. The use of the word "defenseless" in this case refers to the Anabaptist belief in non-resistance.

== Bibliography ==
- Foxe's Book of Martyrs (1563), by John Foxe
- Tieleman Jansz. van Braght (1685). Het bloedig Tooneel, of Martelaers Spiegel der Doops-Gesinde of Weereloose Christenen. Amsterdam: J. Vander Deyster.
- Thieleman Janszoon Braght (1837). I. Rupp (ed.). The Bloody Theater: Or, Martyrs Mirror of the Defenseless Christians. Lancaster County, PA: David Miller.
- Thieleman Janszoon Braght; Jan Luiken (1850). E. Underhill (ed.). A Martyrology of the Churches of Christ, Commonly Called Baptists, During the Era of the Reformation. Vol. I.
- Thieleman Janszoon Braght (1853). E. Underhill (ed.). A Martyrology of the Churches of Christ, Commonly Called Baptists, During the Era of the Reformation. Vol. II.
