= Edward Bean Underhill =

English missionary secretary and biographer

Edward Bean Underhill (1813–1901) was an English missionary secretary, known as a Baptist historian and biographer.

== Life ==
Born at St. Aldate's, Oxford, on 4 October 1813, Underhill was one of seven children of Michael Underhill, a grocer in Oxford, by his wife Eleanor Scrivener. After schooling in Oxford by John Howard Hinton, Underhill went into business as a grocer in Beaumont Street, Oxford, from 1828 until 1843. His wife suffered from poor health, and he then moved to Avening, near Stroud, Gloucestershire.

In 1848 Underhill became proprietor and editor of the Baptist Record, to which he contributed historical papers. After the closure of the magazine in June 1849, Underhill became joint secretary of the Baptist Missionary Society (July 1849). He was sole secretary from 1869 to 1876, and honorary secretary from 1876 until death. The society's work expanded in the period. He visited the missionary centres of the society, and was in India and Ceylon from October 1854 to February 1857. He gave evidence to the committee of the House of Commons on the affairs of India in 1859.

In 1869 Underhill went to the Cameroons, and settled differences among the Baptist missionaries. In 1870 the honorary degree of LL.D. was conferred on him by University of Rochester. In 1873 he became president of the Baptist Union; in 1876 he was made treasurer of the Bible Translation Society, and in 1880 treasurer of the Regent's Park Baptist College, where he had been a committee member since 1857; he now also turned to literary pursuits, writing biographies of James Phillippo (1881), Alfred Saker (1884), and John Wenger (1886). In 1886 he was president of the London Baptist Association.

Underhill died at Hampstead on 11 May 1901, and was buried in Hampstead cemetery.

== Works ==
In Gloucestershire Underhill studied ecclesiastical history from the Baptist point of view. In 1845 he founded the Hanserd Knollys Society for the publication of works by early Baptist writers. Of the ten volumes which appeared Underhill edited seven, two with introductions on the Tudor history of the sect.

The works which Underhill edited for the Hanserd Knollys Society were:

- Underhill, Edward Bean (1846). Tracts on Liberty of Conscience and Persecution, 1614-1661.
- The Records of a Church of Christ, Meeting in Broadmead, Bristol, 1640-1687. 1847.
- The Bloudy Tenent of Persecution discussed: by Roger Williams [1644], 1848.
  - Roger Williams; John Cotton; John Murton (1848). The Bloudy Tenent of Persecution for Cause of Conscience Discussed: And Mr. Cotton's Letter Examined and Answered.
- A Martyrology of the Baptists during the Era of the Reformation: translated from the Dutch of T. J. Van Braght [1660], 2 vols. 1850. Translation of Martyrs Mirror.
  - Thieleman Janszoon Van Braght (1850). A Martyrology of the Churches of Christ, Commonly Called Baptists, During the Era of the Reformation. Vol. 1.
  - Thieleman Janszoon Van Braght (1853). A Martyrology of the Churches of Christ, Commonly Called Baptists, During the Era of the Reformation. Vol. 2..
- Records of the Churches of Christ Gathered at Fenstanton, Warboys, and Hexham. 1644-1720. J. Haddon. 1854.
- Confessions of Faith and Other Public Documents Illustrative of the History of the Baptist Churches of England in the 17th century. J. Haddon. 1854.

After visiting the West Indies, Trinidad, and Jamaica in 1859, Underhill published The West Indies: their Social and Religious Condition (1862). Under the title of The Exposition of Abuses in Jamaica he published in 1865 a letter, exposing cruelties of the planters, which he had addressed to Edward Cardwell, the colonial secretary (5 January 1865). A rising of the natives followed in October. The governor, Edward John Eyre denounced Underhill's pamphlet as an incitement to sedition, and with his supporters attacked Underhill as inaccurate.

Underhill wrote magazine articles, accounts of Baptist missions, and biographies of James Mursell Phillippo (1881), Alfred Saker (1884), and J. Wenger, D.D. (1886). Other works include Distinctive Features of the Baptist Denomination (1851) and The Divine Legation of Paul the Apostle (1889). He contributed an article on Bible translation to the Baptist Missionary Society's centenary volume, 1892.

== Family ==
Underhill married three times:

1. in 1836 to Sophia Ann, daughter of Samuel Collingwood, printer to Oxford University, by whom he had three daughters; she died on 25 October 1850;
2. on 17 November 1852 to Emily, eldest daughter of John Lee Benham of London; she died in the Cameroons on 22 December 1869;
3. on 17 July 1872 to Mary, daughter of Alfred Pigeon, distiller, of London. She survived Underhill till 2 December 1908.

== Bibliography ==
- Edward Bean Underhill (1836). The Case of the Baropakhya Christians, Zillah Backergunge. J. Thomas, at the Baptist Mission Press.
- Edward Bean Underhill (1851). Struggles and triumphs of religious liberty: an historical survey of controversies pertaining to the rights of conscience, from the English Reformation to the settlement of New England. L. Colby.
- Edward Bean Underhill; John Turland Brown (1861). Emancipation in the West Indies: Two Addresses by E.B. Underhill and J.T. Brown, the Deputation from the Baptist Missionary Society to the West Indies, Delivered at a Public Meeting, Held at Willis's Rooms, 20th February, 1861. British and Foreign Anti-slavery Society.
- Edward Bean Underhill (1865). Dr. U.'s letter. A letter addressed to the Rt. Hon. E. Cardwell, with illustrative documents on the condition of Jamaica, and an explanatory statement.
- Edward Bean Underhill (1881). Life of James Mursell Phillippo: Missionary in Jamaica. Yates & Alexander.
- Edward Bean Underhill (1884). Alfred Saker, Missionary to Africa: A Biography. Baptist Missionary Society.
- Edward Bean Underhill (1886). The Life of the Rev. John Wenger, D.D.: Missionary in India, and Translator of the Scriptures Into Bengali and Sanscrit. Baptist Missionary Society, Alexander & Shepheard.
- Edward Bean Underhill (1895). The Tragedy of Morant Bay: A Narrative of the Disturbances in the Island of Jamaica in 1865. Alexander & Shepheard.

== Notes ==
Attribution

This article incorporates text from a publication now in the public domain: Lee, Sidney, ed. (1912). "Underhill, Edward Bean". Dictionary of National Biography (2nd supplement). Vol. 3. London: Smith, Elder & Co.
