= Edmund Chillenden =

English soldier, agitator and theological writer

Edmund Chillenden (fl. 1631–1678) was an English soldier, known as an agitator and theological writer. At different times he was a Leveller and a Fifth Monarchist.

== Life ==
With 60 others, he was arrested at a religious meeting in London in January 1641 at the house of Richard Sturges. He was a prisoner of war in 1642 in Oxford Castle, and wrote a pamphlet on the terrible conditions of his confinement, against William Smith.

He was an officer in the parliamentary New Model Army, in 1646 a Lieutenant and intelligence officer in Whalley's Regiment. He was on the army's General Council in 1647, and a supporter of the Levellers.

Jason Peacey writes of

…informal networks of Puritan activists on the radical Protestant fringe … who were particularly involved in the advancement and propagation of particular religious visions, and explicitly concerned with spreading their message through the medium of print and through 'conspiratorial' publications. This circle included John Lilburne, Samuel Richardson, Edmund Chillingworth, and John Vicars.

== Works ==
He published :

- Preaching without Ordination, London, 1647. Lazarus Seaman wrote a brief answer to this work, appended to his Vindication of the Judgment of the Reformed Churches and Protestant Divines from Misrepresentations concerning Ordination and Laying on of Hands, London 1647. Another reply appeared under the title of Church Members set in Joynt, by Filodexter Transilvanus, (Benjamin Woodbridge), London, 1648.
- Nathan's Parable; with a Letter to his Excellency the Lord General Cromwell, London, 1653, 4to.
- A true relation of the state of the case between the ever-honourable Parliament and the officers of the Army, that fell out on the eleventh and twelfth of October, 1659, London 1659. A condemnation of the Army's actions in expelling the Rump Parliament
