= Church service =

Period of formal Christian worship

A Lutheran Divine Service in Grafton, Wisconsin, 2014

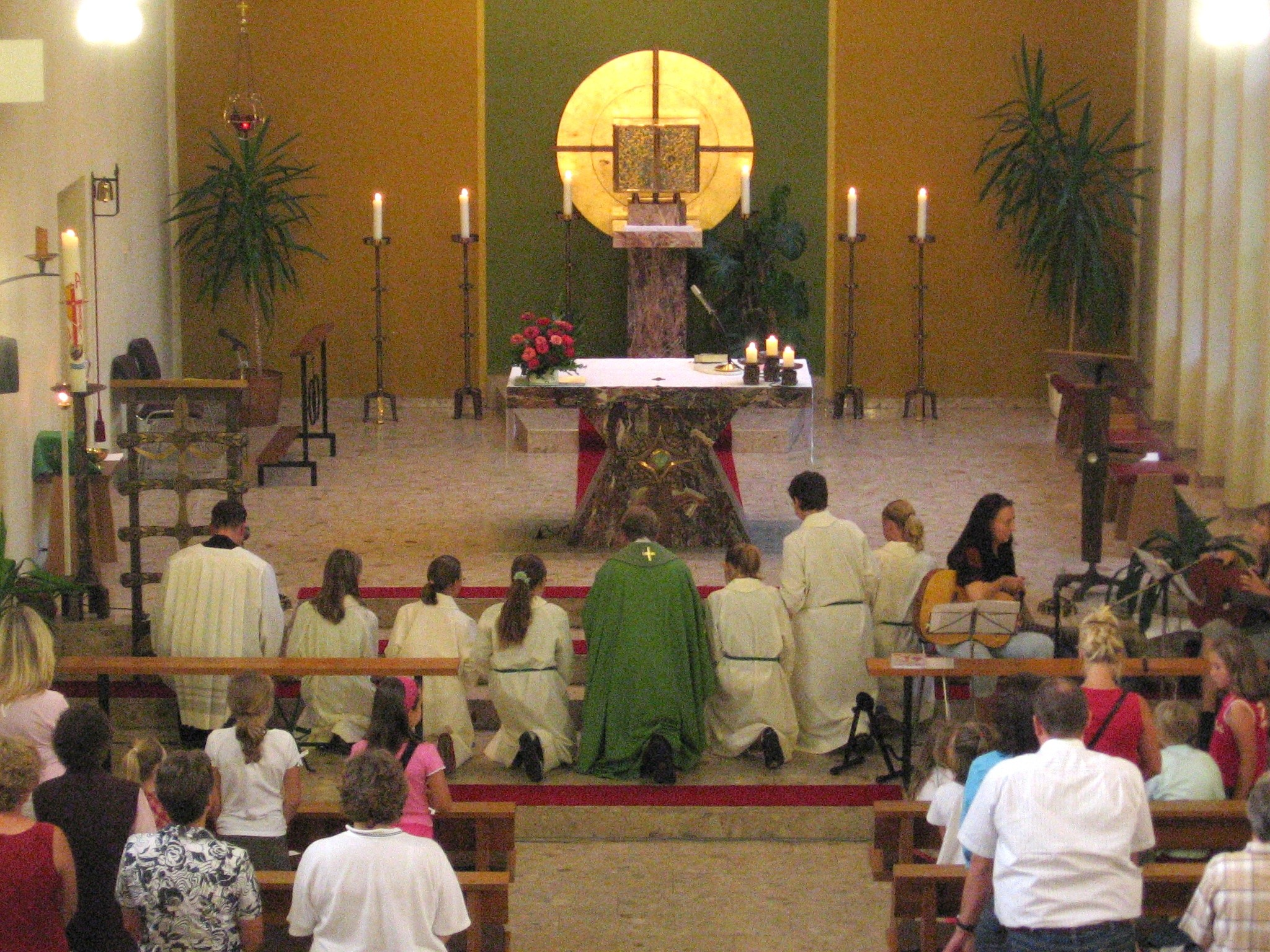
A Catholic Mass at St. Maria Church, Sehnde, Germany, 2009

A church service (or a worship service) is a formalized period of Christian communal worship, often held in a church building. Most Christian denominations hold church services on the Lord's Day (offering Sunday morning and Sunday evening services); a number of traditions have mid-week services, while some traditions worship on a Saturday. (Note: The majority of Christian denominations teach that Sunday is the Lord's Day on which all the faithful must assemble to offer worship to God (cf. first-day Sabbatarianism). A minority of Christian denominations that follow seventh-day Sabbatarianism organize worship on Saturdays.) In some Christian denominations, church services are held daily, with these including those in which the seven canonical hours are prayed, as well as the offering of the Mass, among other forms of worship. In addition to their regular Sunday or midweek church attendance, many Christians attend services on holy days such as Christmas Day, Ash Wednesday, Maundy Thursday and Good Friday, among others depending on the Christian denomination.

The church service is the gathering together of Christians to be taught the "Word of God" (the Christian Bible) and encouraged in their faith. Technically, the church in "church service" refers to the gathering of the faithful rather than to the physical place in which it takes place. In most Christian traditions services are presided over by clergy wherever possible, but some traditions utilize lay preachers. Styles of service vary greatly, from the Catholic, Lutheran, Eastern Orthodox, Oriental Orthodox, Reformed (Continental Reformed, Presbyterian and Congregationalist) and Anglican traditions of liturgical worship to informal worship characterized by certain free church traditions, common among Methodists and Baptists, that often combine worship with teaching for the believers, which may also have an evangelistic component appealing to backsliders and the non-Christians in the congregation (cf. altar call). Quakers and some other groups have no outline to their services, but allow the worship to develop as the participants present feel moved.

== History ==
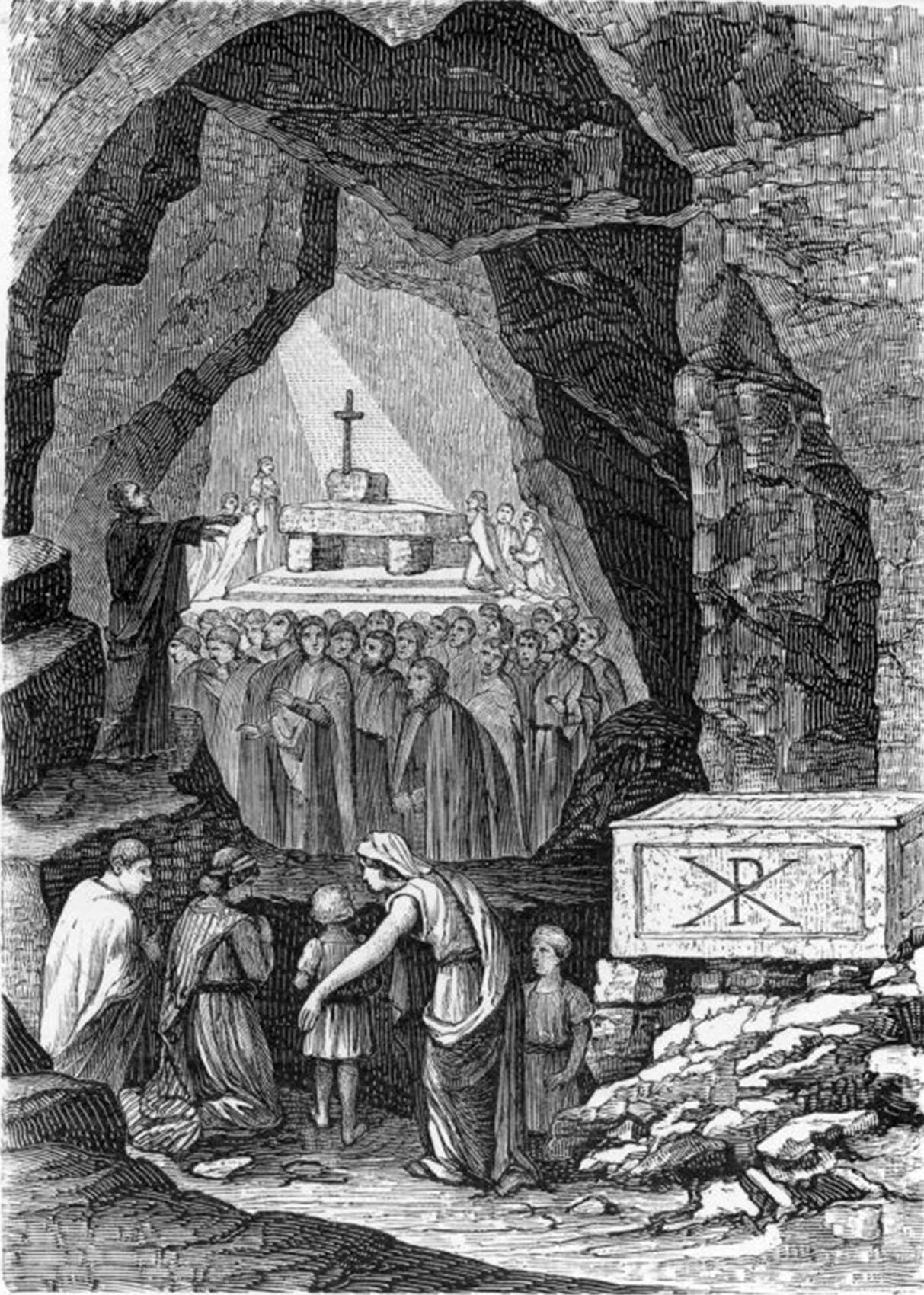
Depiction of early Christian worship in the Catacomb of Callixtus

The worship service is a practice of Christian life that has its origins in Jewish worship. Jesus Christ and Paul of Tarsus taught a new form of worship of God. As recorded in the gospels, Jesus met together with his disciples to share teachings, discuss topics, pray, and sing hymns. The holding of church services pertains to the observance of the Lord's Day in Christianity.

The Old Testament set a precedent for a pattern of morning and evening worship that later gave rise to Sunday morning and Sunday evening services of worship held in the churches of many Christian denominations today, providing a "structure to help families sanctify the Lord's Day". For example, in Numbers 28:1–10 and Exodus 29:38–39, "God commanded the daily offerings in the tabernacle to be made once in the morning and then again at twilight". In Psalm 92, which is a prayer concerning the observance of the Sabbath, the author writes that "It is good to give thanks to the Lord, to sing praises to your name, O Most High; to declare your steadfast love in the morning, and your faithfulness by night" (cf. Psalm 134:1). Church father Eusebius of Caesarea thus declared: "For it is surely no small sign of God's power that throughout the whole world in the churches of God at the morning rising of the sun and at the evening hours, hymns, praises, and truly divine delights are offered to God. God's delights are indeed the hymns sent up everywhere on earth in his Church at the times of morning and evening."

The first miracle of the Apostles, the healing of the crippled man on the temple steps, occurred because Peter and John went to the Temple to pray (Acts 3:1). Since the Apostles were originally Jews, the concept of fixed prayer times, as well as services therefore which differed from weekday to Sabbath to holy day, were familiar to them. Pliny the Younger (63 – c. 113), who was not a Christian himself, mentions not only fixed prayer times by believers, but also specific services—other than the Eucharist—assigned to those times: "They met on a stated day before it was light, and addressed a form of prayer to Christ, as to a divinity [...] after which it was their custom to separate, and then reassemble, to eat in common a harmless meal."

The real evolution of the Christian service in the first century is shrouded in mystery. By the second and third centuries, such Church Fathers as Clement of Alexandria, Origen, and Tertullian wrote of formalised, regular services: the practice of Morning and Evening Prayer, and prayers at the third hour of the day (terce), the sixth hour of the day (sext), and the ninth hour of the day (none). The concept of major hours of prayer corresponding to the first and last hour of the day likely correspond to Jewish practices; that Sunday services (corresponding to the Sabbath in Christianity) are more complex and longer (involving twice as many services if one counts the Eucharist and the afternoon service) also likely have root in Jewish practices. Similarly, the liturgical year from Christmas via Easter to Pentecost covers roughly five months, the other seven having no major services linked to the work of Christ. Though worship services had their origins in Jewish services, it is unlikely that Jewish services were copied or deliberately substituted (see Supersessionism).

== Common features ==
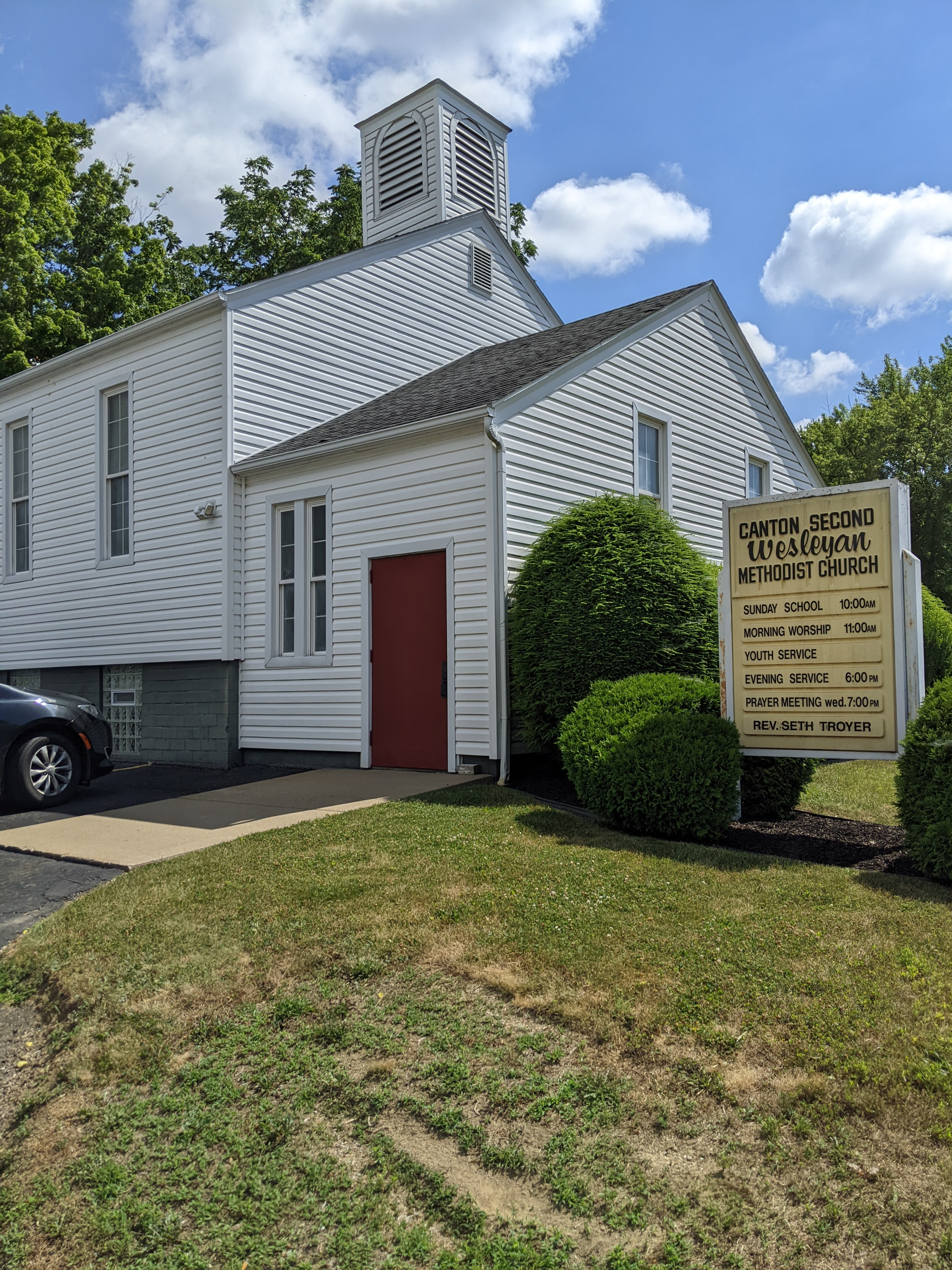
The sign of this Wesleyan Methodist church displays the times for the Sunday morning service of worship and Sunday evening service of worship, consistent with the historical First-day Sabbatarian doctrine of Methodism to hallow the Lord's Day. The midweek Wednesday prayer service (a common observance in Methodism) is indicated on the sign as well.

A church service generally includes a reading of scripture verses and possibly a psalm. If the church follows a lectionary, this will identify the readings to be used, and if there is a sermon, this will often relate to the scripture lections assigned to that day. Bible services are devoted primarily to the reading and explanation of biblical texts. Styles of service vary greatly, from the Catholic, Lutheran, Eastern Orthodox, Oriental Orthodox, Reformed (Continental Reformed, Presbyterian, and Congregationalist), and Anglican traditions of liturgical worship to informal worship characterized by certain free church traditions, common among Methodists and Baptists, which often combine worship with teaching for the believers, which may also have an evangelistic component.

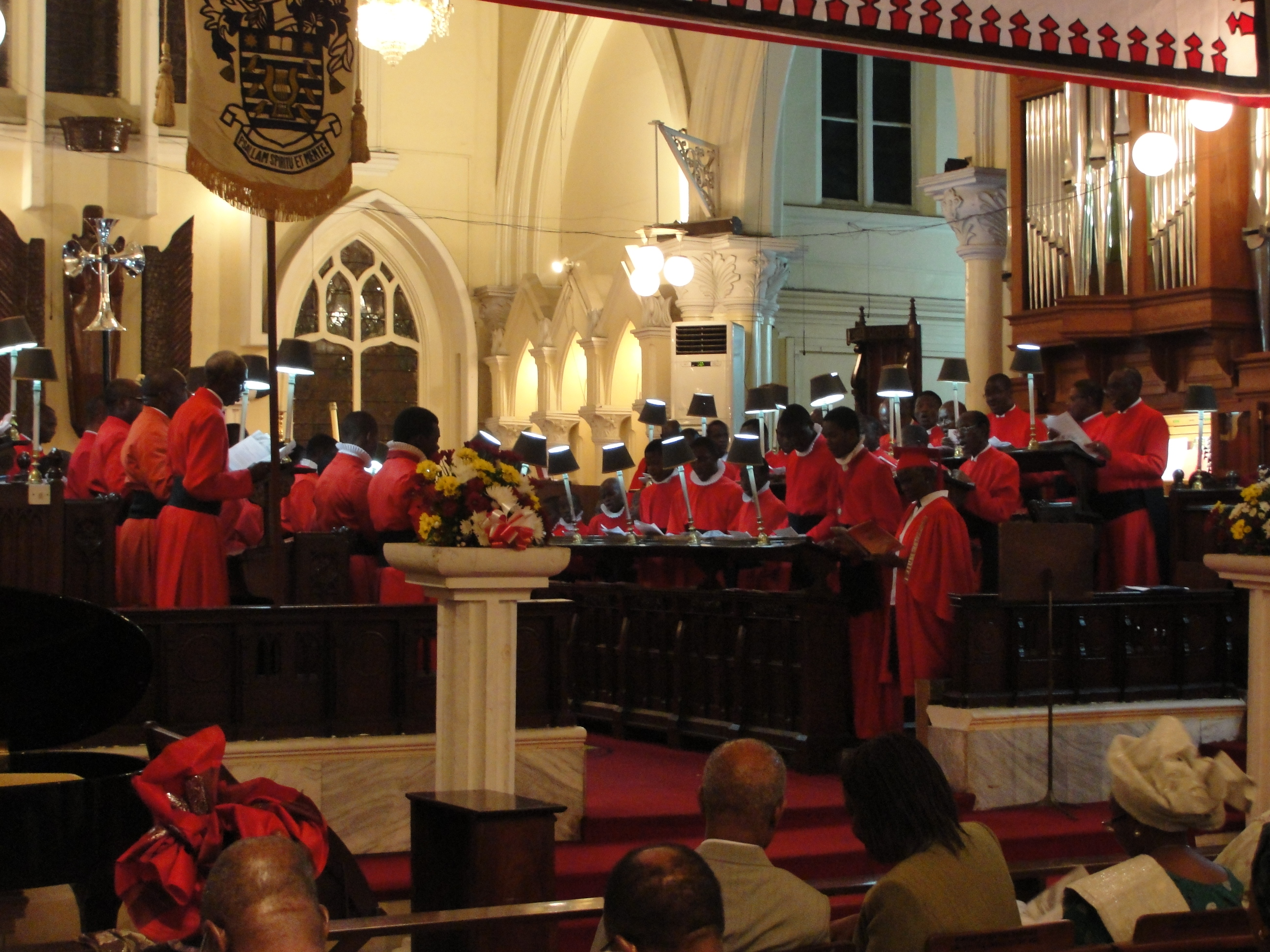
Church choir singing at a service, Cathedral Church of Christ, Lagos, Nigeria

Often services include the singing of hymns. Vocal music is traditionally sung by a choir or the congregation (or a mixture of the two), usually accompanied by an organ. Sometimes other instruments such as piano, classical instruments, or modern band instruments may be part of the service, especially in churches influenced by the contemporary worship movement. Some churches are equipped with state-of-the-art multi-media equipment to add to the worship experience. The congregation may sing along in hymnals or words to hymns and worship songs may be displayed on a screen. More liturgical denominations may have the words to specific prayers written in a missalette or prayer book, which the congregation follows. Though most of the services are still conducted in church buildings designed specifically for that purpose, some services take place in "store front" or temporary settings.

For those unable to attend a service in a church building a burgeoning televangelism and radio ministry provides broadcasts of services. A number of websites have been set up as "cyber-churches" to provide a virtual worship space free to anyone on the internet. Church services are often planned and led by a single minister (pastor) or a small group of elders or may follow a format laid out by the dictates of the denomination.

Some churches are "lay led" with members of the congregation taking turns guiding the service or simply following format that has evolved over time between the active members. More commonly, an ordained minister will preach a sermon (which may cover a specific topic, or as part of a book of the Bible which is being covered over a period of time). Depending on the church, a public invitation follows whereby people are encouraged to become Christians, present themselves as candidates for baptism or to join the congregation (if members elsewhere), or for other purposes. Many congregations begin their church services with the ringing of a bell (or a number of bells); a current trend is to have an introductory video which serves as a "countdown" to the beginning of the service. Eucharistic churches have usually Holy Communion either every Sunday or several Sundays a month. Less liturgical congregations tend to place a greater emphasis on the sermon. Many churches will take up a collection of money (offertory) during the service. The rationale for this is taken from 1 Corinthians 16:1–2, 1 Corinthians 9:9–11, and 1 Timothy 5:16–18. But some churches eschew this practice in favor of voluntary anonymous donations for which a box or plate may be set up by the entrance, or return-address envelopes may be provided that worshippers may take with them. Offering through the Internet has become a common practice in many evangelical churches. On occasion, some churches will also arrange a second collection, typically occurring after Communion, for a specific good cause or purpose.

Some churches offer Sunday school classes. These will often be for younger children, and may take place during the whole of the service (while the adults are in church), or the children may be present for the beginning of the service and at a prearranged point leave the service to go to Sunday school. Some churches have adult Sunday school either before or after the main worship service.

Attendance for the whole of a church service is the norm. The Second Vatican Council stressed for Catholic church members that taking part in "the entire Mass" was important, especially on Sundays and holidays of obligation. In the Eastern Orthodox Church, members of the congregation may leave the service and return later if they wish, for example worshippers with children may often take a break and return later.

Following the service, there will often be an opportunity for fellowship in the church hall or other convenient place. This provides the members of the congregation a chance to socialize with each other and to greet visitors or new members. Coffee or other refreshments may be served.

=== Contemporary church services ===
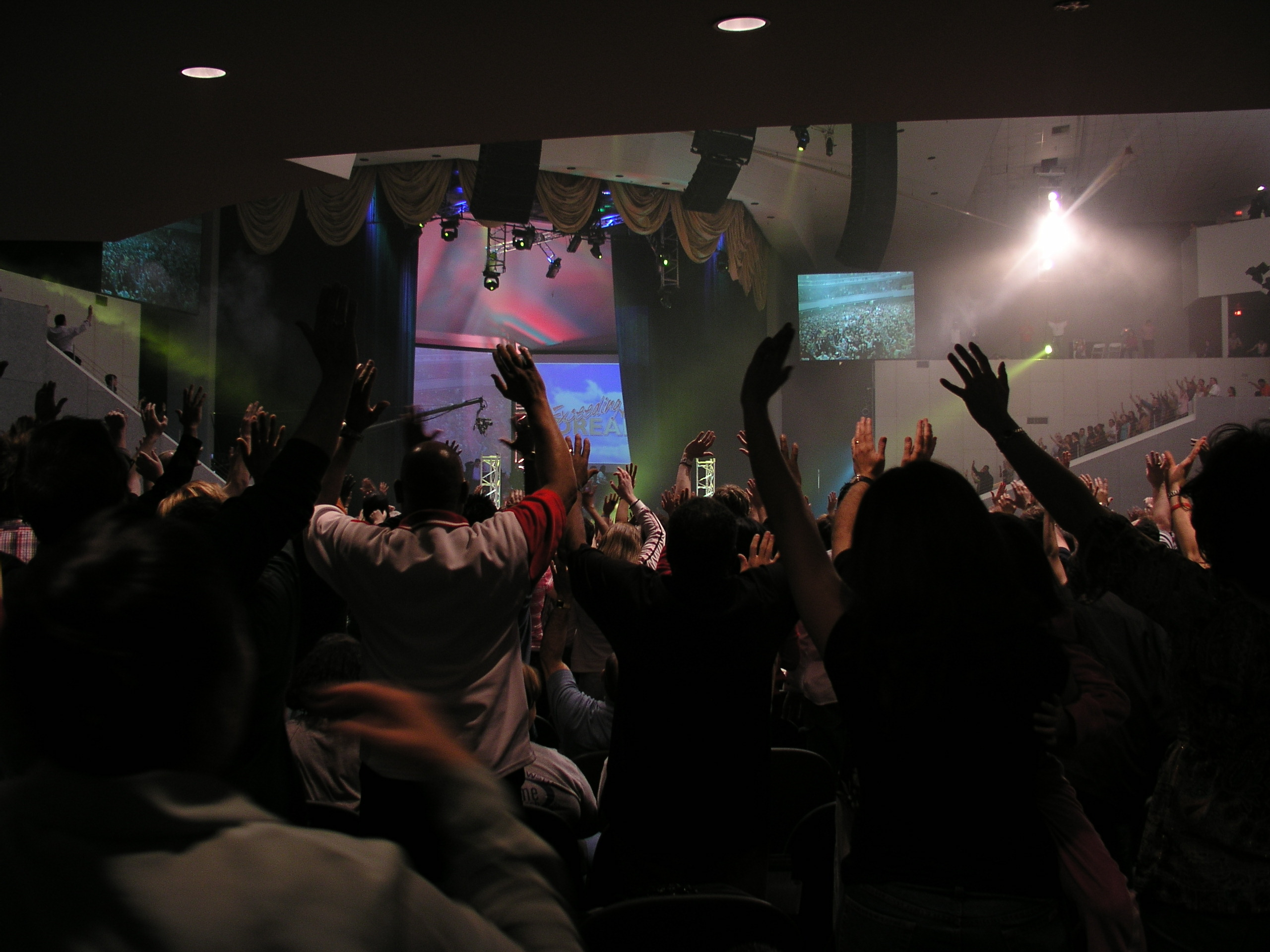
A Pentecostal worship service at Dream City Church, affiliated with the Assemblies of God USA, in 2007, in Phoenix, United States

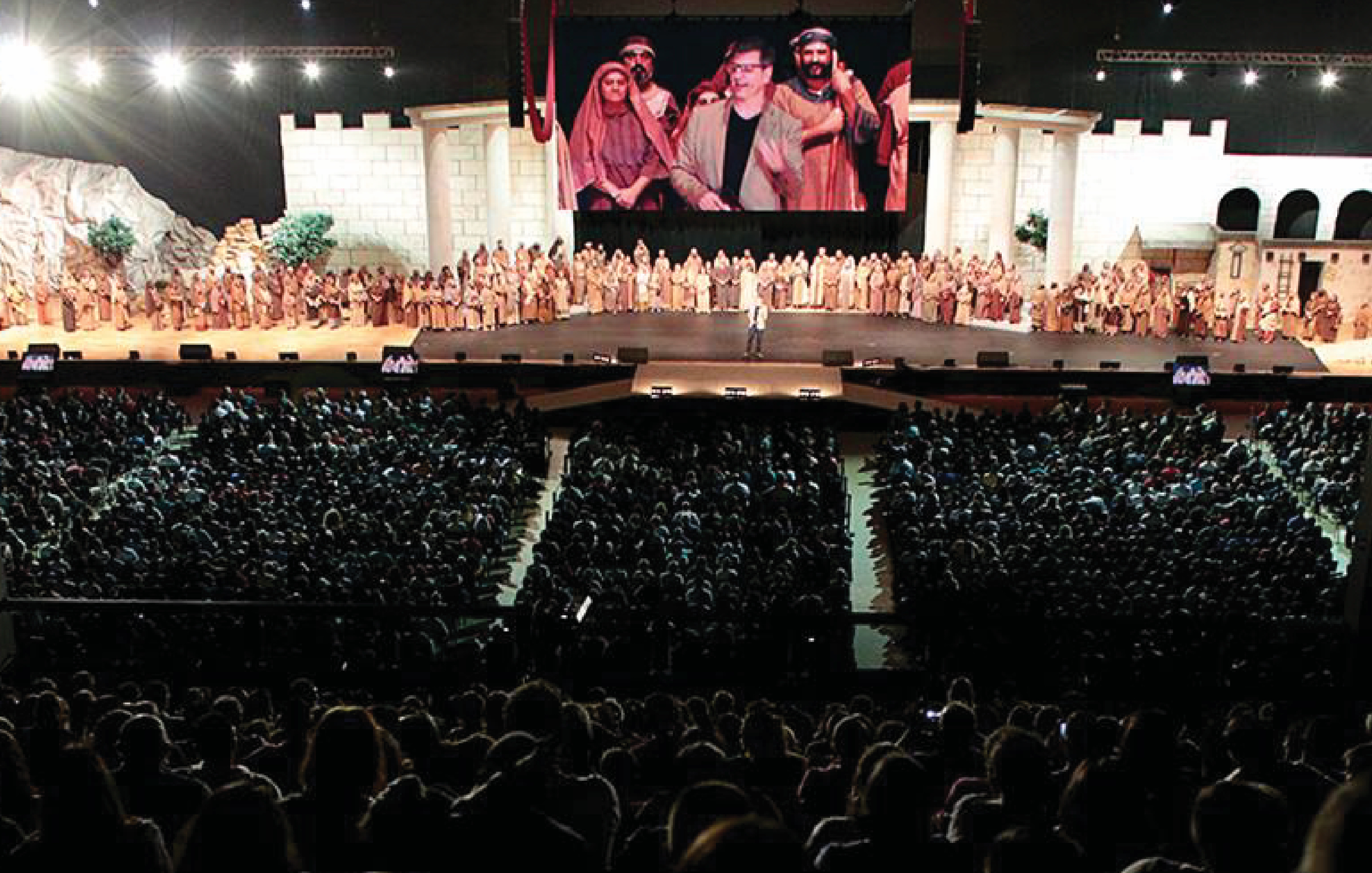
Show on the life of Jesus at City Church, affiliated to the Brazilian Baptist Convention, in São José dos Campos, 2017

Contemporary worship services have their origins in the Jesus Movement of the 1960s. In the 1980s and 1990s, contemporary Christian music, comprising a variety of musical styles, such as Christian rock and Christian hip-hop was adopted by evangelical churches. Over the years, the organs have been replaced by pianos, electric guitars and drums. These contemporary worship services feature a sermon based on the Bible. Worship service in Evangelical churches is seen as an act of God's worship. It is usually run by a Christian pastor. It usually contains two main parts, the praise and the sermon, with periodically the Lord's Supper. During worship there is usually a nursery for babies. Prior to the worship service, adults, children and young people receive an adapted education, Sunday school, in a separate room. With the 1960s' charismatic movement, a new conception of praise in worship, such as clapping and raising hands as a sign of worship, took place in many evangelical denominations. In the 1980s and 1990s, contemporary Christian music, including a wide variety of musical styles, such as Christian Rock, appeared in the praise. Some churches have services with traditional Christian music, others with contemporary Christian music, and some offer both in separate services. In the 2000s and 2010s, digital technologies were integrated into worship services, such as the video projectors for broadcasting praise lyrics or video, on big screens. The use of social media such as YouTube and Facebook to retransmit live or delayed worship services, by Internet, has also spread. The offering via Internet has become a common practice in several churches. In some churches, a special moment is reserved for faith healing with laying on of hands during worship services. Faith healing or divine healing is considered a legacy of Jesus acquired by his death and resurrection. The taking up of tithes and offerings (gifts made beyond the tithe) is a normative part of the worship services. The main Christian feasts celebrated by Evangelicals are Christmas, Easter and Pentecost, among others depending on denomination.

=== Quaker meeting for worship ===
Quakers (the Religious Society of Friends), like other Nonconformist Protestant denominations, distinguish between a church, which is a body of people who believe in Christ, and a 'meeting house' or 'chapel', which is a building where the church meets. Quakers have both unprogrammed and programmed meetings for worship. Unprogrammed worship is based on waiting in silence and inward listening to the Spirit, from which any participant may share a message. In unprogrammed meetings for worship, someone speaks when that person feels that God/Spirit/the universe has given them a message for others. Programmed worship includes many elements similar to Protestant services, such as a sermon and hymns. Many programmed meetings also include a time during the service for silent, expectant waiting and messages from the participants.

== Types of church service ==
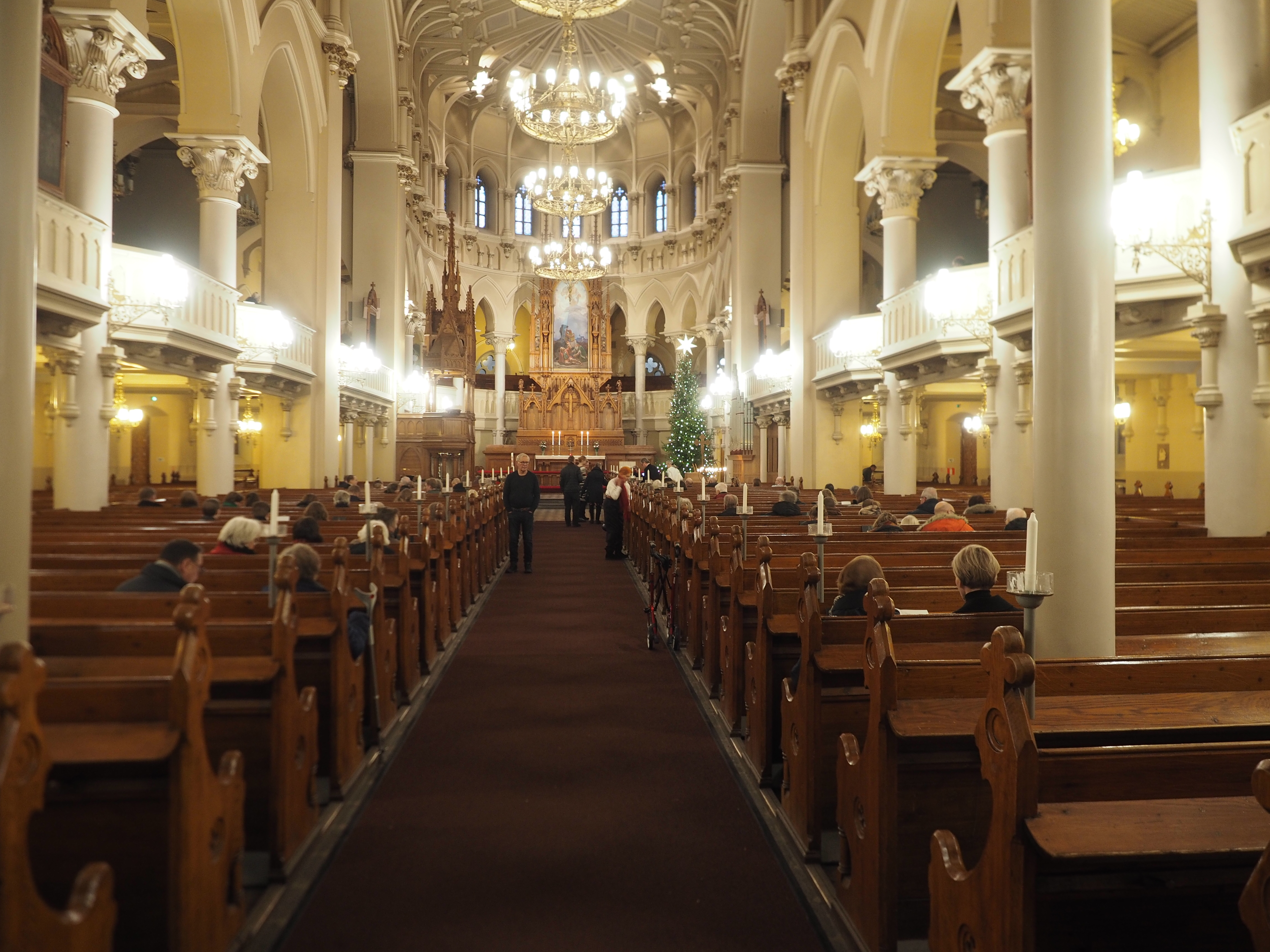
During a Christmas service at St. John's Church in Helsinki, Finland

Church services take many forms, and set liturgies may have different names. Services typically include:

- Regular Sunday services: these have a place in most Christian traditions. Holy Communion may be celebrated at some or all of these; often it is included either once a month or once a quarter. A few denominations have their main weekly services on Saturday rather than Sunday. Larger churches often tend to have several services each Sunday; often two or three in the morning and one or two in the late afternoon or evening, as well services on Saturday which anticipate the feast or designation of the following Sunday. Some churches hold religious services conducted through internet technology, for the benefit of those who cannot attend for health or other reasons, or who may want to preview the church before attending in person.
- Midweek services. Again, Holy Communion can be part of these, either on every occasion or on a regular basis.
- Holiday (feast day) services. Treated like a regular Sunday service, but made more specific for the day.
- Weddings. These are normally separate services, rather than being incorporated into a regular service, but may be either.
- Funerals. These are generally held as separate services.
- Baptisms. These may be incorporated into a regular service, or separate.
- Confirmation. This is often incorporated into a regular Sunday service, which will also include communion. It was traditionally the first Communion of the confirmee, but more recently, children are invited to communion in some denominations, whether confirmed or not.
- Ordination of clergy. New bishops, elders, priests and deacons are usually ordained or installed during a solemn but celebratory ceremony on Saturday or Sunday, generally open to the public, either by their own superior or by another approved senior minister with ordination powers. The service is held either at the area headquarters church or cathedral or at another church agreed upon by those to be ordained and the ordaining ministers. Ordination of bishops or elders may require consecration by more than one individual and have a more limited audience.
- First Communion. Children may celebrate Communion for the first time.
- Opening of new churches or church buildings.
- Dedication of new missionaries or those about to be sent on new missions.

== Places of worship ==
Places of worship are usually called "churches" or "chapels". Some services take place in theaters, schools or multipurpose rooms, rented for Sunday only.

== Attire ==
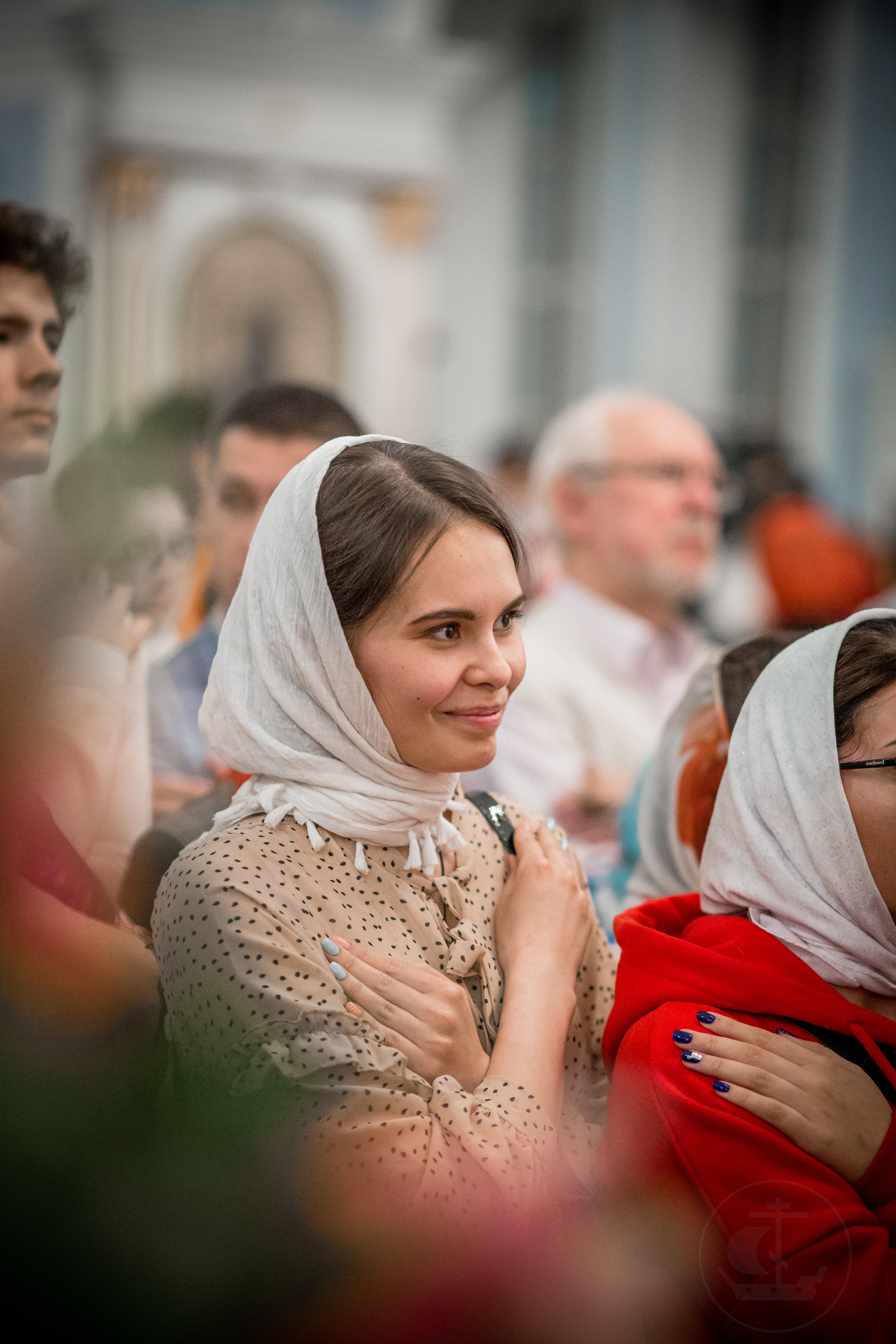
Russian worshippers during the Divine Liturgy in Moscow. Women are wearing headcoverings, while men worship with their heads uncovered.

Christians have historically tended to wear modest clothes at church services (cf. 1 Timothy 2:9–10). Men have traditionally removed their caps while praying and worshipping, while women have traditionally worn a headcovering while praying and worshipping (cf. 1 Corinthians 11:1–11). These practices continue to be normative in certain churches, congregations, and denominations, as well as in particular parts of the world, such as in Eastern Europe and in the Indian subcontinent, while in the West, attention to these observances has waned generally (apart from those denominations that continue to require them, such as Conservative Anabaptist churches). In many nondenominational Christian churches, it may be customary, depending on the locality, for people to be dressed casually.

== See also ==
- Cafe church
- Canonical hours
  - Compline
- Carol service
- Christian liturgy
- Christian worship
- Church attendance
- Church membership
- Daily Office (Anglican)
- Divine Liturgy
- Divine Service (Lutheran)
- Easter Vigil
- Mass (liturgy)
- Worship services of the Church of Jesus Christ of Latter-day Saints
