= Baptist World Alliance =

International Christian denomination

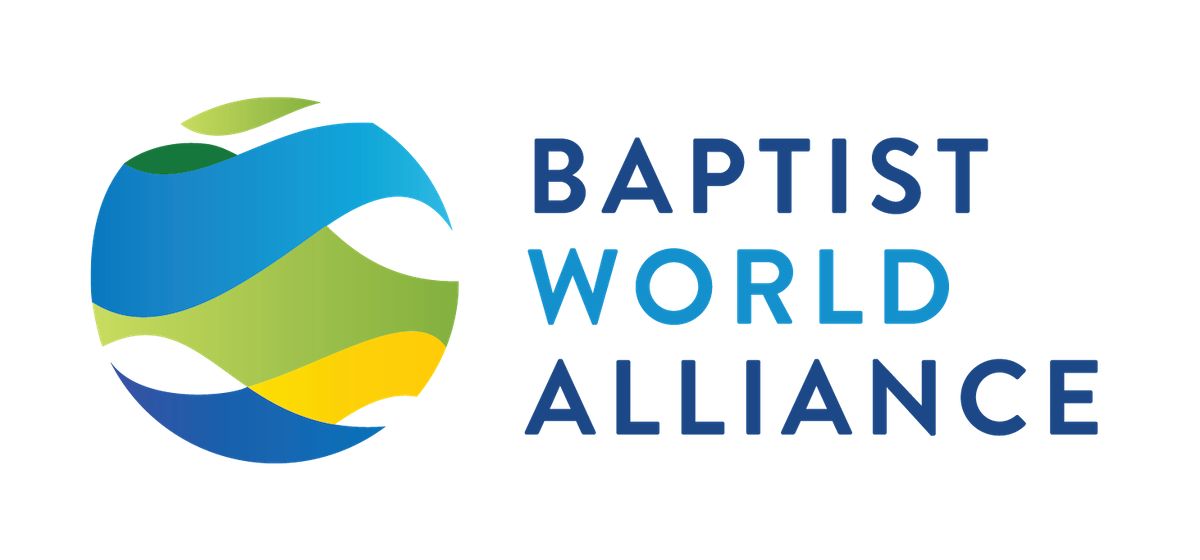
- Type: Communion
- Classification: Protestant
- Orientation: Baptist
- General Secretary and CEO: Elijah M. Brown, since 2018
- Chair: Karl Johnson, since 2025
- Region: 138 countries
- Headquarters: Falls Church, Virginia, U.S.
- Origin: July 1905; London, United Kingdom
- Congregations: 178,000
- Members: 53,871,526
- Missionary organization: Global Baptist Mission Network
- Aid organization: BWAid
- Official website: baptistworld.org

The Baptist World Alliance (BWA) is an international communion of Baptists, with an estimated 53 million people from 283 member bodies in 138 countries and territories as of 2025. A voluntary association of Baptist churches, the BWA accounts for about half the Baptists in the world, becoming Christianity's seventh-largest communion (see list of Christian denominations by membership).

The BWA was founded in 1905 in London during an international congress of Baptist churches. Its headquarters are in Falls Church, Virginia, United States. It is led by general secretary and CEO Elijah M. Brown, Karl Johnson of the Jamaica Baptist Union, Chair of the Alliance and Lynn Green of the Baptist Union of Great Britain, Vice Chair.

== History ==
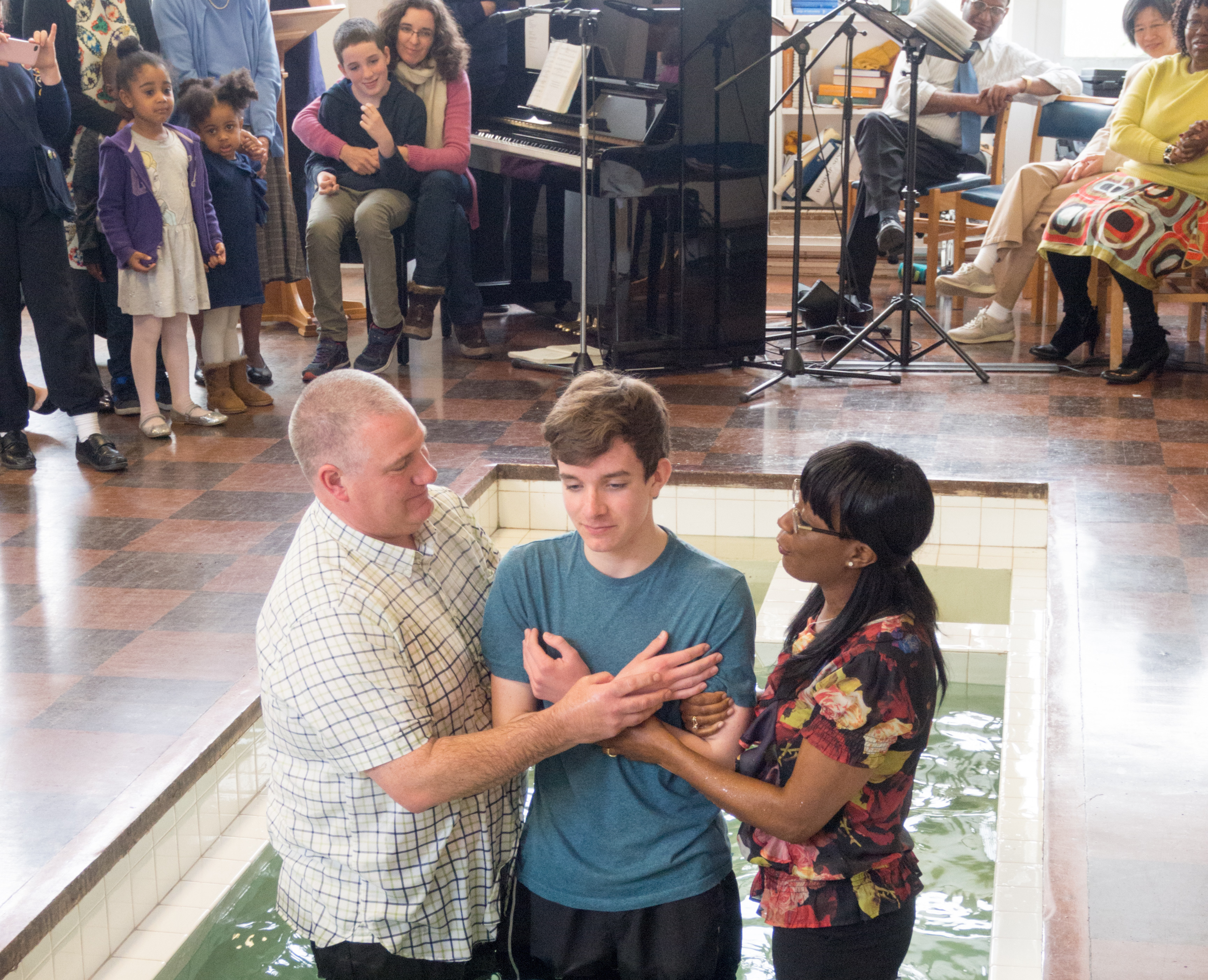
Believer's baptism of adult by immersion at Northolt Park Baptist Church, in Greater London, Baptist Union of Great Britain.

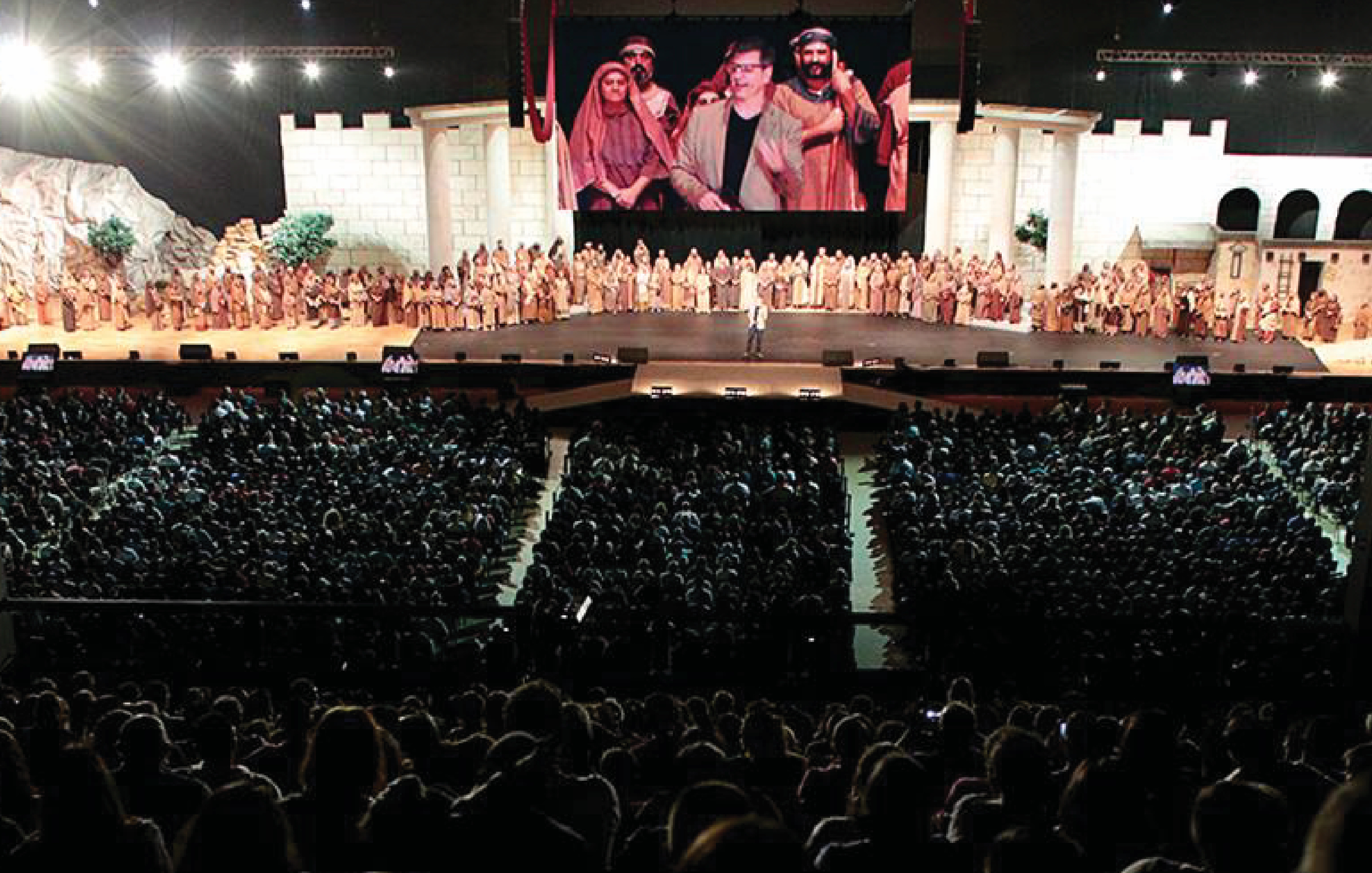
Show on the life of Jesus at City Church, affiliated to the Brazilian Baptist Convention, in São José dos Campos, Brazil, 2017.

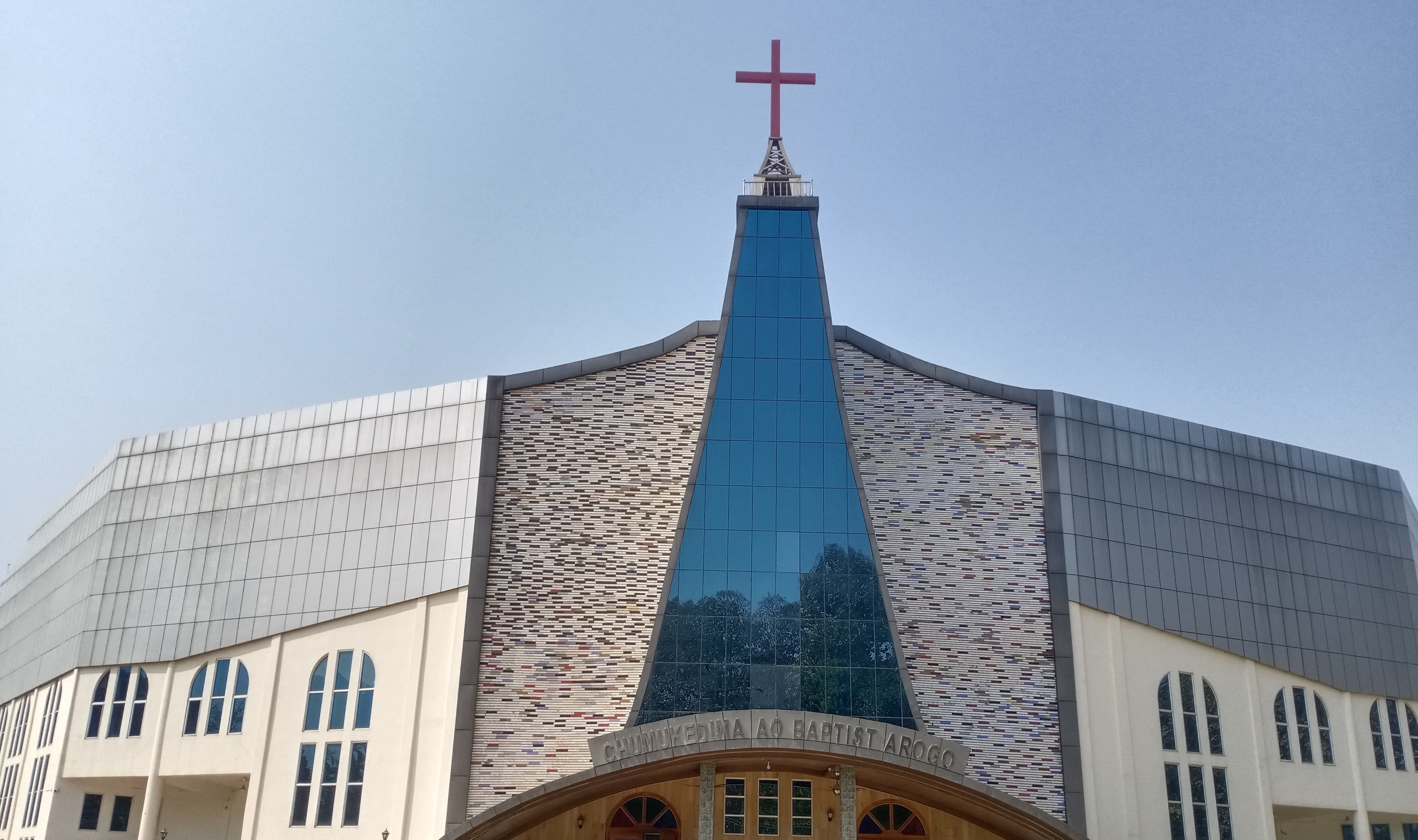
Chümoukedima Ao Baptist Church building in Chümoukedima, affiliated with the Nagaland Baptist Church Council (India).

The roots of the Baptist World Alliance can be traced back to the seventeenth century when Thomas Grantham, the Baptist Messenger and leading divine (theologian) of Lincolnshire, proposed the concept of a congregation of all Christians in the world that are "baptised according to the appointment of Christ." Similar proposals were put forward later such as the call of John Rippon in 1790 for a world meeting of Baptists "to consult the ecclesiastical good to the whole."

It was, however, only in 1904 when such a congregation became a reality. John Newton Prestridge, editor of The Baptist Argus, at Louisville, Kentucky, called for a world gathering of Baptists. John Howard Shakespeare, editor of The Baptist Times and Freeman, London, endorsed the proposal. In October 1904, the Baptist Union of Great Britain passed a resolution to invite a Congress to meet with them in 1905. At the Congress, a committee was formed, which proposed a Constitution for a World Alliance. The Baptist World Alliance was founded in London, during this first Baptist World Congress in July 1905. Every five years since, the BWA holds a Baptist World Congress in different locations around the world, and multiple international meetings and programs are held in the times between Congresses.

The gathering was referred to as an "alliance" and not a council in order to establish the nature of the dialogue as a meeting. This means that the body wields no authority over participating churches or national Baptist unions, serving only as a forum for collaboration.

In 2003, the International Baptist Convention, an international association of English-speaking churches, became a member.

In 2004, the messengers of the Southern Baptist Convention voted to withdraw from the Baptist World Alliance (BWA) because a member association, the American Baptist Churches USA had accepted an organization that included 2 churches favorable to the blessings of same-sex marriage as well as perceived anti-American sentiment, which were partly attributed to Alliance Secretary General Denton Lotz's visits to Fidel Castro in Cuba. A year later, two state denominational members of the Southern Baptist Convention—the Baptist General Association of Virginia and the Baptist General Convention of Texas—affirmed their continued support and applied for membership in the Alliance, and were subsequently admitted.

In July 2025, Karl Johnson of the Jamaica Baptist Union became Chair of the Alliance and Lynn Green of the Baptist Union of Great Britain became Vice Chair.

== List of members ==
As of February 2025, the Baptist World Alliance listed 267 unions, conventions and associations of Baptist churches as members, which together claimed a total of 53,803,096 members. In June 2025, 9 new denominations were received into membership, increasing the total number of member bodies to 276, which together represented 53,871,526 individual members.

Country	Denomination	Number of members
Angola	Baptist Convention of Angola	37,500
Angola	Evangelical Baptist Church in Angola	174,218
Angola	Free Baptist Church in Angola	4,383
Angola	Evangelical Baptist Union of Angola	14,250
Antigua and Barbuda	Antigua Baptist Association	250
Argentina	Argentine Baptist Association (ABA)	8,700
Argentina	Evangelical Baptist Convention of Argentina	85,000
Armenia	Union of Evangelical Christian Baptist Churches of Armenia	6,205
Australia	Australian Baptist Ministries	79,326
Austria	Baptist Union of Austria	1,887
Azerbaijan	Union of Evangelical Christian-Baptists of Azerbaijan	3,000
Bahamas	National Missionary and Educational Baptist Convention of the Bahamas	88,000
Bangladesh	Bangladesh Baptist Church Fellowship	58,000
Bangladesh	Bangladesh Baptist Church Sangha (BBCS)	29,948
Bangladesh	Bangladesh Garo Baptist Convention	13,300
Barbados	Baptist Alliance of Barbados	181
Barbados	Baptist Convention of Barbados	200
Belarus	Union of Evangelical Christian Baptists of Belarus	11,597
Belgium	Union of Baptists in Belgium	1,532
Belize	Belize Baptist Association	4,000
Benin	Union of Baptist Churches in Benin	13,695
Bermuda	Bermuda Baptist Fellowship	330
Bolivia	Baptist Convention of Bolivia	20,761
Bolivia	Bolivian Baptist Union	50,580
Bosnia and Herzegovina	Christian Baptist Church in Bosnia and Herzegovina	250
Botswana	Baptist Convention of Botswana	657
Brazil	Brazilian Baptist Convention	1,814,158
Brazil	Convention of Independent Baptist Churches (CIBI)	41,000
Brazil	National Baptist Convention of Brazil	405,816
Bulgaria	Baptist Union of Bulgaria	2,600
Burkina Faso	Union of Evangelical Baptist Churches of Burkina Faso	10,000
Burundi	Baptist Union of Burundi	98,500
Burundi	Free Baptist Churches of Burundi	15,188
Cambodia	Baptist Union of Cambodia	5,914
Cameroon	Cameroon Baptist Convention	270,735
Cameroon	Native Baptist Church of Cameroon	16,000
Cameroon	Union of Baptist Churches in Cameroon	80,000
Canada	Canadian Baptist Ministries	70,616
Canada	Canadian National Baptist Convention	17,991
Cape Verde	Association of the Evangelical Baptist Church of Cape Verde	371
Central African Republic	Association of Baptist Churches of the Central African Republic	84,755
Central African Republic	Union of Baptist Churches (UEB)	14,400
Central African Republic	Central African Evangelical Baptist Community (CEBAC)	60,000
Central African Republic	Baptist Brotherhood Church	8,690
Central African Republic	Fellowship of Evangelical Baptist Churches in Central Africa (CEBEC)	11,000
Central African Republic	Evangelical Baptist Church of the Central African Republic (EEB)	98,855
Central African Republic	Fraternal Union of Baptist Churches	49,742
Central African Republic	National Association of Baptist Churches (ANEB)	38,500
Chad	Evangelical Baptist Church of Chad	121
Chile	National Baptist Convention of Chile	2,410
Chile	Union of Evangelical Baptist Churches of Chile	25,749
Colombia	Colombian Baptist Denomination	21,300
Democratic Republic of the Congo	Baptist Church of the Congo	52,200
Democratic Republic of the Congo	Baptist Community in Central Africa (CBCA)	220,591
Democratic Republic of the Congo	Baptist Community of the Congo River (CBFC)	1,769,444
Democratic Republic of the Congo	Baptist Community of the Faithful in Africa (CBFA)	48,724
Democratic Republic of the Congo	Baptist Community of Western Congo (CBCO)	1,050,000
Democratic Republic of the Congo	Evangelical Baptist Convention of Congo (CBECO)	4,221
Democratic Republic of the Congo	Community of Autonomous Baptist Churches Wamba-Bakali	45,600
Democratic Republic of the Congo	Community of Baptist Churches of North Congo (CBCN)	41,544
Democratic Republic of the Congo	Community of Baptist Churches of Eastern Congo (CEBCE)	145,100
Democratic Republic of the Congo	Community of Baptist Churches of the Union of Churches of Congo (CUEBC)	46,321
Democratic Republic of the Congo	Community of Independent Evangelical Baptist Churches	40,104
Democratic Republic of the Congo	Community of United Baptist Churches (CEBU)	62,500
Democratic Republic of the Congo	Convention of Evangelical Baptist Churches of Congo (CEBEC)	2,821
Democratic Republic of the Congo	Union of Baptist Churches of Congo (UEBCO)	26,278
Republic of the Congo	Federation of Baptist Churches of Congo	2,600
Costa Rica	Federation of Baptist Associations of Costa Rica	2,600
Côte d'Ivoire	Union of Missionary Baptist Churches of Côte d'Ivoire	15,000
Croatia	Baptist Union of Croatia	1,764
Cuba	Eastern Baptist Convention of Cuba	43,500
Cuba	Western Baptist Convention Association of Cuba	28,095
Cuba	Fellowship of Baptist Churches in Cuba	2,198
Cuba	Free Will Baptist Convention of Cuba	5,125
Czech Republic	Baptist Union of the Czech Republic	2,363
Denmark	Baptist Union of Denmark	4,771
Dominican Republic	Dominican Baptist Convention	350
Ecuador	Baptist Convention of Ecuador	23,560
Egypt	Egyptian Baptist Convention	2,500
El Salvador	Baptist Association of El Salvador	9,500
El Salvador	Baptist Federation of El Salvador	1,140
Equatorial Guinea	Baptist Church of Equatorial Guinea	170
Estonia	Union of Evangelical Christian and Free Baptist Churches of Estonia	6,465
Ethiopia	Emmanuel Baptist Church of Ethiopia	94,000
Ethiopia	Ethiopian Baptist Church	65,000
Ethiopia	Evangelical Baptist Church of Ethiopia	6,000
Fiji	Baptist Convention of Fiji	800
Finland	Baptist Union of Finland	1,003
Finland	Finnish Baptist Union	1,003
France	Federation of Evangelical Baptist Churches of France	5,730
The Gambia	Baptist Union of The Gambia	1,344
Georgia	Evangelical Baptist Church of Georgia	810
Germany	International Baptist Convention	4,621
Germany	Union of Evangelical Free Churches (Baptists) in Germany	73,029
Ghana	Baptist Convention of Ghana	99,988
Grenada	Grenada Baptist Association	520
Guadeloupe	Baptist Federation of Evangelical Churches of Guadeloupe	1,350
Guatemala	Convention of Baptist Churches in Guatemala	70,184
Guyana	Baptist Convention of Guyana	2,600
Haiti	Association of Conservative Baptist Churches of Haiti (ASEBACH)	22,400
Haiti	Haitian Baptist Churches Connection for Integral Mission (CEBAHMI)	41,000
Haiti	Southern Haiti Evangelical Baptist Mission (MEBSH)	60,000
Haiti	Baptist Convention of Haiti	79,375
Honduras	National Convention of Baptist Churches in Honduras	25,150
Hong Kong	Hong Kong Baptist Convention	83,266
Hungary	Baptist Union of Hungary	11,530
Hungary	Hungarian Baptist Aid	75,000
India	Council of Baptist Churches in Arunachal Pradesh	152,532
India	Assam Baptist Convention	44,559
India	Telugu Baptist Churches Association	42,080
India	Baptist Church of Mizoram	132,695
India	Baptist Churches Council of Eastern India (BCCEI)	27,112
India	Northern India Baptist Union	15,700
India	Bengal Baptist Union (BBU)	11,150
India	Convention of Baptist Churches of Northern Circars	240,000
India	Evangelical Baptist Convention of India	40,882
India	Garo Baptist Convention of India	377,132
India	Association of General Baptists in India	10,300
India	Baptist Convention of India	8,000
India	Karbi Anglong Baptist Convention	40,866
India	Karnataka Baptist Convention	90,500
India	Lairam Jesus Christ Baptist Church	23,126
India	Lower Assam Baptist Fellowship (LABF)	39,978
India	Maharashtra Baptist Society	14,826
India	Manipur Baptist Convention	232,730
India	Nagaland Baptist Church Council	716,495
India	North Bank Baptist Christian Association	136,227
India	Orissa Baptist Evangelistic Crusade (OBEC)	3,842
India	Samavesam of Telugu Baptist Churches	475,639
India	Telangana Baptist Convention	74,200
India	Tripura Baptist Christian Union	80,360
India	Tamil Nadu Baptist Union	2,000
Indonesia	Convention of Indonesian Baptist Churches	9,976
Indonesia	Union of Indonesian Baptist Churches	49,332
Israel	Association of Baptist Churches in Israel	900
Italy	Evangelical Christian Baptist Union of Italy	4,100
Jamaica	Jamaica Baptist Union	40,200
Japan	Japan Baptist Conference	476
Japan	Japan Baptist Convention	13,218
Japan	Japan Baptist Union	3,116
Japan	Okinawa Baptist Convention	2,059
Jordan	Jordan Baptist Convention	1,524
Kenya	Kenya Baptist Convention	2,000,000
Korea	Korea Baptist Convention	550,000
Latvia	Union of Baptist Churches in Latvia	6,077
Lebanon	Convention of Evangelical Baptist Churches in Lebanon	1,600
Lebanon	THIMAR-LSESD	124,053
Liberia	Liberia Baptist Missionary and Educational Convention (LBMEC)	55,392
Lithuania	Baptist Union of Lithuania	202
Macau	Macau Baptist Convention	750
North Macedonia	Union of Baptist Christians in the Republic of North Macedonia	200
Madagascar	Association of Baptist Bible Churches in Madagascar	11,133
Malawi	African Baptist Assembly, Malawi	72,000
Malawi	Baptist Convention of Malawi	388,000
Malawi	Evangelical Baptist Church of Malawi	19,000
Malaysia	Malaysia Baptist Convention	28,613
Mauritius	Mauritius Baptist Association	151
Mexico	National Baptist Convention of Mexico	90,000
Moldova	Union of Evangelical Christian Baptist Churches of Moldova	17,361
Mozambique	Baptist Convention of Mozambique	175,000
Mongolia	Samoa Baptist Union and International Ministries	500
Myanmar	Myanmar Baptist Convention	1,723,500
Myanmar	Self-Supporting Kayin Baptist Mission Society	14,871
Myanmar	Zomi Baptist Convention of Myanmar	24,263
Namibia	Baptist Convention of Namibia	16,024
Nepal	Baptist Church Council of Nepal	28,029
Netherlands	UNIE-ABC: Baptist and CAMA Churches in the Netherlands	14,541
New Zealand	Baptist Union of New Zealand	18,633
Nicaragua	Baptist Convention of Nicaragua (CBN)	20,867
Niger	Union of Evangelical Baptist Churches of Niger	5,012
Nigeria	Mambilla Baptist Convention	32,000
Nigeria	Nigerian Baptist Convention	9,015,000
Norway	Baptist Union of Norway	6,622
Palestinian Territories	Council of Local Evangelical Churches in the Holy Land	1,500
Panama	Baptist Convention of Panama	5,040
Papua New Guinea	Baptist Union of Papua New Guinea, Inc.	85,100
Papua New Guinea	Fellowship of Baptist Churches of Papua	70,000
Paraguay	Evangelical Baptist Convention of Paraguay	21,500
Peru	Evangelical Baptist Convention of Peru	14,000
Philippines	Baptist Conference of the Philippines, Inc.	35,000
Philippines	Convention of Philippine Baptist Churches, Inc.	700,000
Philippines	Visayas and Mindanao Convention of Southern Baptist Churches	200,000
Philippines	General Baptist Churches of the Philippines, Inc.	18,000
Philippines	Luzon Convention of Southern Baptist Churches, Inc.	52,000
Poland	Baptist Union of Poland	5,760
Portugal	Portuguese Baptist Convention	4,800
Romania	Baptist Union of Romania	87,468
Romania	Convention of Hungarian Baptist Churches in Romania	7,855
Russian Federation	Euro-Asian Federation of Unions of Evangelical Christians-Baptists	228,995
Russian Federation	Russian Union of Evangelical Christians-Baptists	66,732
Rwanda	Association of Baptist Churches in Rwanda (AEBR)	58,960
Rwanda	Baptist Churches of Christian Unity	12,051
Rwanda	Community of Christian Churches in Africa (CECA)	67,408
Rwanda	Reformed Baptist Convention in Rwanda	662,883
Rwanda	Union of Baptist Churches in Rwanda	30,040
Rwanda	Seira Community Church	5,200
Samoa	Samoa Baptist Union and International Ministries	300
Saint Kitts and Nevis	Saint Kitts Baptist Association	787
Saint Vincent and the Grenadines	Saint Vincent Baptist Convention	1,141
São Tomé and Príncipe	Baptist Convention of São Tomé and Príncipe (CBSTP)	350
Senegal	Association of Baptist Churches of Senegal	760
Serbia	Union of Baptist Churches in Serbia	920
Serbia	Union of Christian Baptist Churches in Serbia	348
Sierra Leone	Sierra Leone Baptist Convention	25,075
Singapore	Singapore Baptist Convention	9,700
Slovakia	Baptist Union in Slovakia	1,963
Slovenia	Union of Baptist Churches in Slovenia	160
South Africa	Baptist Association of South Africa	2,000
South Africa	Baptist Convention of South Africa	23,485
South Africa	Baptist Mission of South Africa	2,000
South Africa	Baptist Union of Southern Africa	32,738
South Sudan	Baptist Convention of South Sudan	30,500
South Sudan	Evangelical Faith Baptist Church of South Sudan	15,846
South Sudan	Evangelical Faith Baptist Church of Sudan	14,912
Spain	Union of Evangelical Baptist Churches of Spain	11,284
Sri Lanka	Sri Lanka Baptist Sangamaya	4,195
Sudan	Sudan Interior Church	133,000
Sweden	Uniting Church in Sweden	57,118
Switzerland	Swiss Baptist Union	880
Syria	Syrian Baptist Convention	1,000
Taiwan	Chinese Baptist Convention	25,500
Tanzania	Baptist Church of Tanzania	2,692,179
Thailand	12th District of the Church of Christ in Thailand	17,267
Thailand	Karen Baptist Church of Kawthoolei (KKBC)	18,208
Thailand	Thailand Baptist Convention	16,000
Thailand	Karen Baptist Convention of Thailand	48,355
Thailand	Lahu Baptist Convention of Thailand	9,067
Togo	Baptist Convention of Togo	25,923
Trinidad and Tobago	Baptist Union of Trinidad and Tobago	5,000
Turkey	Turkish Baptist Alliance	175
Turks and Caicos Islands	Turks and Caicos Islands Baptist Union, Inc.	612
Uganda	Baptist Union of Uganda	550,000
Uganda	Baptist Convention of Uganda	109,200
Ukraine	All-Ukrainian Union of Associations of Evangelical Christian Baptists	112,000
United Kingdom	Baptist Union of Great Britain	99,121
United Kingdom	Baptist Union of Scotland	8,586
United Kingdom	Baptist Union of Wales	6,971
United Kingdom	BMS World Mission	61
United States of America	American Baptist Churches USA	1,105,426
United States of America	Baptist General Association of Virginia	610,000
United States of America	Baptist General Convention of Texas	1,898,142
United States of America	Baylor University	20,000
United States of America	Buckner International	140,000
United States of America	Chin Baptist Churches USA (CBCUSA)	34,881
United States of America	Converge (Baptist General Conference)	377,146
United States of America	Cooperative Baptist Fellowship	725,000
United States of America	Czechoslovak Baptist Convention of the USA and Canada	300
United States of America	Dallas Baptist University	4,201
United States of America	Baptist Convention of the District of Columbia	41,394
United States of America	General Association of General Baptists	38,286
United States of America	Howard Payne University	832
United States of America	Lott Carey Baptist Foreign Mission Society, USA	1,200,000
United States of America	Baptist Missionary Conference, USA	10,000
United States of America	National Baptist Convention International, Inc.	3,500,000
United States of America	National Baptist Convention, USA, Inc.	8,415,000
United States of America	National Missionary Baptist Convention of America	400,000
United States of America	North American Baptist Conference	60,000
United States of America	Progressive National Baptist Convention, Inc.	1,500,000
United States of America	Russian-Ukrainian Evangelical Baptist Union, USA, Inc.	950
United States of America	General Conference of Seventh Day Baptists USA and Canada	3,454
United States of America	Latvian Baptist Union in America	99
United States of America	Zomi Baptist Churches of America	7,000
United States of America	Kachin Baptist Churches USA	2,700
United States of America	Hispanic Baptist Convention of Texas	42,520
Uruguay	Evangelical Baptist Convention of Uruguay	3,550
Uzbekistan	Union of Evangelical Christian Baptists of Uzbekistan	2,735
Venezuela	National Baptist Convention of Venezuela	48,000
Vietnam	Baptist Convention of Vietnam (BCV)	58,300
Zambia	Baptist Convention of Zambia	143,840
Zambia	Baptist Community of Zambia	255,000
Zambia	Baptist Union of Zambia	220,000
Zimbabwe	Baptist Convention of Zimbabwe	300,100
Zimbabwe	Baptist Missionary Association of Zimbabwe	8,136
Zimbabwe	Baptist Union of Zimbabwe	4,725
Zimbabwe	National Baptist Convention of Zimbabwe	2,835
Zimbabwe	United Baptist Church of Zimbabwe	9,756
World	Baptist World Alliance	53,871,526

== Statistics ==
According to an Alliance census released in 2025, the BWA has 283 participating Baptist fellowships in 138 countries, with 178,000 churches and 53,000,000 baptized members. However, some churches and members may be counted more than once if they belong to more than one Baptist association, each being members of the BWA.

== Beliefs ==
The communion has a Baptist confession of faith.

== Structure ==
The BWA is divided into six regional or geographical fellowships: North American Baptist Fellowship, Caribbean Baptist Fellowship, Latin American Baptist Union, European Baptist Federation, Asia Pacific Baptist Federation, and All-Africa Baptist Fellowship. Each regional fellowship is served by an Executive Secretary.

=== List of general secretaries ===
In the initial stages of the Baptist World Alliance, the role of General Secretary was split into two geographical regions. In 1928, these positions were merged into a single general secretary role.

Name	Term	Country
Eastern or European Secretaries
John Howard Shakespeare	1905-1924	United Kingdom
James Henry Rushbrooke	1925-1928	United Kingdom
Western or American Secretaries
John Newton Prestridge	1905-1913	United States
Robert Healy Pitt	1913-1923	United States
Clifton Daggett Gray	1923-1928	United States
General Secretaries
James Henry Rushbrooke	1928-1939	United Kingdom
Walter O. Lewis	1939-1948	United States
Arnold T. Ohrn	1948-1960	Norway
Josef Nordenhaug	1960-1969	Norway
Robert S. Denny	1969-1980	United States
Gerhard Claas	1980-1988	Germany
Denton Lotz	1988-2007	United States
Neville Callam	2007-2017	Jamaica
Elijah M. Brown	2018-present	United States

=== List of presidents (renamed Chair in 2025) ===
Name	Term	Country
John Clifford	1905–1911	UK
Robert Stuart MacArthur	1911–1923	USA
Edgar Young Mullins	1923–1928	USA
John MacNeill	1928–1934	Canada
George Washington Truett	1934–1939	USA
James Henry Rushbrooke	1939–1947	UK
Charles Oscar Johnson	1947–1950	USA
Fred Townley Lord	1950–1955	UK
Theodore Floyd Adams	1955–1960	USA
Joao Filson Soren	1960–1965	Brasil
William Tolbert	1965–1970	Liberia
Carney Hargroves	1970–1975	USA
David Wong	1975–1980	Hong Kong
Duke Kimbrough McCall	1980–1985	USA
Noel Vose	1985–1990	Australia
Knud Wümpelmann	1990–1995	Denmark
Nilson do Amaral Fanini	1995–2000	Brasil
Billy Kim	2000–2005	South Korea
David Coffey	2005–2010	UK
John Upton	2010–2015	USA
Paul Mzisa	2015–2020	South Africa
Tomás Mackey	2020–1015	Argentina
Karl Johnson	2025-2030	Jamaica

== Baptist World Congress ==
Baptist World Congresses have been held every few years since 1905.

No.	Year	City	Country
1.	1905	London	GBR
2.	1911	Philadelphia	USA
3.	1923	Stockholm	SWE
4.	1928	Toronto	CAN
5.	1934	Berlin	DEU
6.	1939	Atlanta	USA
7.	1947	Copenhagen	DNK
8.	1950	Cleveland	USA
9.	1955	London	GBR
10.	1960	Rio de Janeiro	BRA
11.	1965	Miami Beach	USA
12.	1970	Tokyo	JPN
13.	1975	Stockholm	SWE
14.	1980	Toronto	CAN
15.	1985	Los Angeles	USA
16.	1990	Seoul	KOR
17.	1995	Buenos Aires	ARG
18.	2000	Melbourne	AUS
19.	2005	Birmingham	GBR
20.	2010	Honolulu	USA
21.	2015	Durban	ZAF
22.	2021 (Online)	Online	N/A
23.	2025	Brisbane	AUS

== Affiliated organizations ==
=== Global Baptist Mission Network ===
The Global Baptist Mission Network has 23 member mission organizations.

=== BWAid ===
BWAid supports humanitarian aid projects.

=== BFAD ===
BWA Forum for Aid and Development (BFAD) brings together 30 Baptist humanitarian agencies.

== Ecumenical relations ==
The Baptist World Alliance is involved in ecumenical dialogues with the Roman Catholic Church and the World Methodist Council, among others. One series of International Conversations between the BWA and the Catholic Church took place from between 1984 and 1988 moderated by the Reverend Dr David T. Shannon, sometime President of Andover Newton Theological School, and the Most Reverend Bede Heather, Bishop of Parramatta. While this dialogue produced the report called Summons to Witness to Christ in Today's World, the second phase did not push through because of opposition from within the Baptist World Alliance itself. Negotiations continued, however, so that a series of consultations transpired from 2000 to 2003. During this period the Baptists and Catholics discussed important doctrines that divided these denominations. These second series of conversations resulted in formal meetings between 2006 and 2010. The current Co-Moderators are Paul Fiddes, Professor of Systematic Theology in the University of Oxford and formerly Principal of Regent's Park College, Oxford, and Arthur J. Serratelli, Bishop of Paterson.

== See also ==
- List of Baptist confessions
- List of Baptist World Alliance National Fellowships
- World Evangelical Alliance
- Believers' Church
