= Neville Callam =

Jamaican Baptist minister and theologian (died 2026)

Neville Callam (died 15 August 2026) was a Jamaican Baptist minister and theologian, who was the General Secretary Emeritus of the Baptist World Alliance.

== Early life and education ==
Callam was born in Jamaica to a committed Baptist family, his father a deacon and his mother involved in other ministries. He discovered his own Christian faith as a teenager.

He was educated at the United Theological College of the West Indies, the University of the West Indies, and Harvard Divinity School and was ordained in 1977.

== Career ==
In his pastoral ministry Callam served as senior pastor of the Grace/Mineral Heights and Tarrant/Balmagie Circuits. He was also an academic specialising in Christian ethics and theology and taught at the United Theological College of the West Indies, the Caribbean Graduate School of Theology, and Jamaica Theological Seminary, and, was a visiting lecturer, at Barbados Baptist College. He also served on the University Council of Jamaica, the accrediting body for colleges and universities in Jamaica. He wrote five books and published journal articles and book chapters. He was a popular speaker at forums, symposiums, seminars and workshops throughout the world.

Callam also enjoyed a career in the media. He created and ran The Breath of Change (TBC FM), a religious radio station, and was a founding director of the National Religious Media Company of Jamaica, the operator of LOVE FM and LOVE TV. He also served as Chairman of the Board of the Public Broadcasting Corporation of Jamaica.

He had a long career in the service of the Jamaica Baptist Union. He held the positions of chairman of the media commission, general treasurer, acting general secretary, and finally, president, serving terms 1985-87 and 2000-02. He was vice president of the Caribbean Baptist Fellowship and from 2000 until 2005 he was vice president of the Baptist World Alliance, having served on many of its committees, commissions, and workgroups, including the general council and executive committee. On 6 July 2007 he was elected General Secretary of the BWA during a meeting of the general council at Accra.

== Personal life and death ==
Callam was married for over 30 years with two children. He died on 15 August 2026.
