= Baptist College of Minas Gerais =

College in Belo Horizonte, Brazil

- Type: Private
- Established: 1999
- Affiliation: Mineira Baptist Convention (Brazilian Baptist Convention)
- Location: Belo Horizonte, Brazil
- Campus: Urban
- Website: fbmg.edu.br

The Baptist College of Minas Gerais (Faculdade Batista de Minas Gerais - FBMG) is Baptist college located in Belo Horizonte, Brazil. It is affiliated with the Mineira Baptist Convention (Brazilian Baptist Convention).

== History ==
It was founded in 1999 by the Mineira Baptist Convention (Brazilian Baptist Convention).

== Academics ==
It has positive ratings in Brazilian magazines, in the academic milieu and from Brazil's Ministry of Education (MEC). In 2010 the course of Administration (Bachelor's Degree) received three stars in the Guia Abril (a publication for recent high-school graduates entering college in Brazil) and was considered by Brazil's Ministry of Education as one of the five best courses in Belo Horizonte. Also, law students at FBMG have a high rate of approval in Brazil's Order of Attorneys of Brazil exam and it has a good Theology course.

== Parent Organizations ==
The institution is part of the Baptist Mineiro System of Education (Sistema Batista Mineiro de Educação - SBME), which, in turn, is part of the Baptist Convention of Minas Gerais (Convenção Batista Mineira).
