= The Baptist Times =

British religious news website, formerly a newspaper established in 1885

- Owner: Baptist Union of Great Britain
- Founded: 1855; 170 years ago
- Language: English
- Country: United Kingdom
- ISSN: 0005-5786
- Website: www.baptisttimes.co.uk

The Baptist Times is a website owned by the Baptist Union of Great Britain which reports on the Baptist Church in Britain.

It was originally a newspaper, printed from 24 January 1855 as The Freeman. From 24 February 1899 it was The Baptist Times and Freeman. In 1910 it merged with The Baptist. It was renamed The Baptist Times in 1925. Circulation at its height was 35,000; by 2011 it had fallen to 6,000.

It was the free church newspaper which had been published for longest, followed by The Methodist Times. Old issues are interesting to social historians as well as to historians of religion, as they contain news about current affairs and "poems, book reviews, stories for children and advertisements".

It won the Churches Media Council's Andrew Cross Award for the best regional paper, for its production of a daily paper for the Baptist World Congress in 2005.

Due to falling circulation and difficulties of selling advertising space, the paper ceased print publication in November 2011, with plans for a retrospective to be published in January 2012. The website launched in 2012.

== Fake news controversy ==
In November 2019, an EU Watchdog uncovered evidence that The Baptist Times was among 265 media outlets which had been used by an India-based influence network to spread disinformation about Pakistan.
