= Elijah M. Brown =

American Baptist minister

- Education: University of Edinburgh (Ph.D.)
- Occupations: Church minister; human rights activist; executive officer; scholar
- Organization: Baptist World Alliance
- Spouse: Amy Brown
- Children: 3

Elijah M. Brown is an American scholar, minister, human rights activist, and executive officer. He is the current General Secretary of the Baptist World Alliance (BWA), assuming office on January 1, 2018.

== Early life and education ==
Brown, born in Texas, United States, earned a bachelor's degree from the University of Mary Hardin-Baylor with a double major in religion and history. He later completed his Ph.D. in divinity with a focus on World Christianity at the University of Edinburgh in Scotland.

== Ministry and career ==
Brown began his involvement with the Baptist World Alliance in 2005. Before assuming the role of General Secretary, he served the global Baptist family in various capacities, including Regional Secretary for North America and General Secretary for the North American Baptist Fellowship.

Brown specializes in human rights and religious liberty. He previously served as Executive Vice President of 21Wilberforce and as an associate professor of religion at East Texas Baptist University.

He was the keynote speaker at Howard Payne University’s 16th annual Currie-Strickland Distinguished Lectures in Christian Ethics in January 2024 and commencement speaker at Union University in December 2023.

== Accolades ==
In 2007, Brown was named one of 35 global emerging leaders by the Baptist World Alliance and in 2019, Brown was presented with the Campbellsville University Leadership Award by Campbellsville University in Kentucky.
