= Jamaica Baptist Union =

Baptist Christian denomination in Jamaica

- Abbreviation: JBU
- Classification: Evangelical Christianity
- Theology: Baptist
- President: Rev. Dwight Fraser
- Headquarters: Kingston, Jamaica
- Origin: 1849
- Congregations: 340
- Members: 40,132
- Missionary organization: Jamaica Baptist Union Mission Agency
- Official website: jbu.church

The Jamaica Baptist Union is a Baptist Christian denomination, affiliated with the Baptist World Alliance, founded in 1849 in Jamaica. The headquarters is in Kingston, Jamaica. The president of the union is Rev. Dr. Glenroy Lalor.

== History ==
The Baptist Union of Jamaica dates back to 1782 when George Liele, a formerly-enslaved man from Atlanta, Georgia, came to Jamaica and began preaching in Kingston. In 1814, the Baptist Missionary Society, a British organization, sent its first missionary to the island to open a school in Falmouth in Trelawny Parish, for the children of slaves. The ministry continued to grow and expand during British colonization.

Baptists are involved in the struggle for the abolition of slavery. After abolition, Baptists contributed to the creation of "Free Villages" for the newly emancipated people. This included the purchase of large parcels of land cut into small holdings, which were sold to families. The villages also included a school and a Baptist church.

The Baptists also created, in 1843, the Calabar Theological College for training ministers for local preaching and missions in Africa and the Caribbean, which became part of the United Theological College of the West Indies in 1966.

In 1849, the Jamaica Baptist Union is officially founded.

Three of Jamaica's National Heroes - Sam Sharpe, Paul Bogle, and George William Gordon - were also Baptist.

In 2018, Karen Kirlew became the first female president of the union.

According to a census published by the association in 2023, it claimed 340 churches and 40,132 members.

== Missionary Organization ==
The convention has a missionary organization, Jamaica Baptist Union Mission Agency.

== See also ==
- Bible
- Born again
- Baptist beliefs
- Jesus Christ
- Believers' Church
