= The Baptist Argus =

American Baptist newspaper (1897–1919)

The Baptist Argus (renamed The Baptist World in 1909) was published in Louisville, Kentucky, between the years 1897 and 1919. The Argus/World published information on the activities of the Baptist church, from missionary appointments to changes in pastoral guidance at the local level and major actions of the statewide conferences.

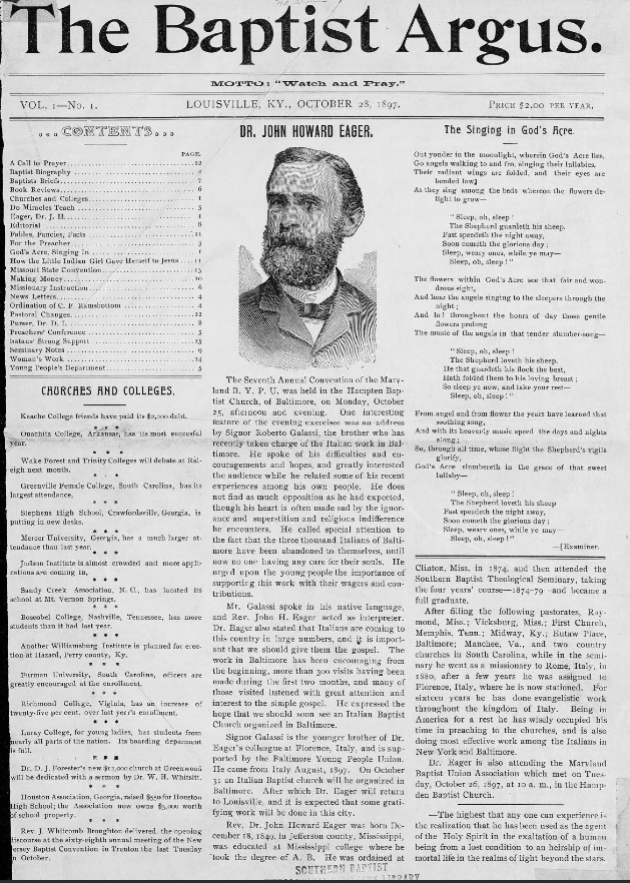
Front page of the first edition of The Baptist Argus, published in Louisville, Kentucky on October 28, 1897. Image via the Baylor University Libraries Digital Collections.

== Digitization by Baylor University ==
In the fall of 2014, the Digital Projects Group of the Baylor University Electronic Library digitized a full run of The Baptist Argus / The Baptist World and placed it online via their Digital Collections site. The physical copies of the Argus/World were loaned to Baylor University by the Southern Baptist Theological Seminary. The collection is full-text searchable and contains every printed issue from 1897 to 1919.
