= City Church (Brazil) =

Megachurch in São José dos Campos, Brazil

- Igreja da Cidade
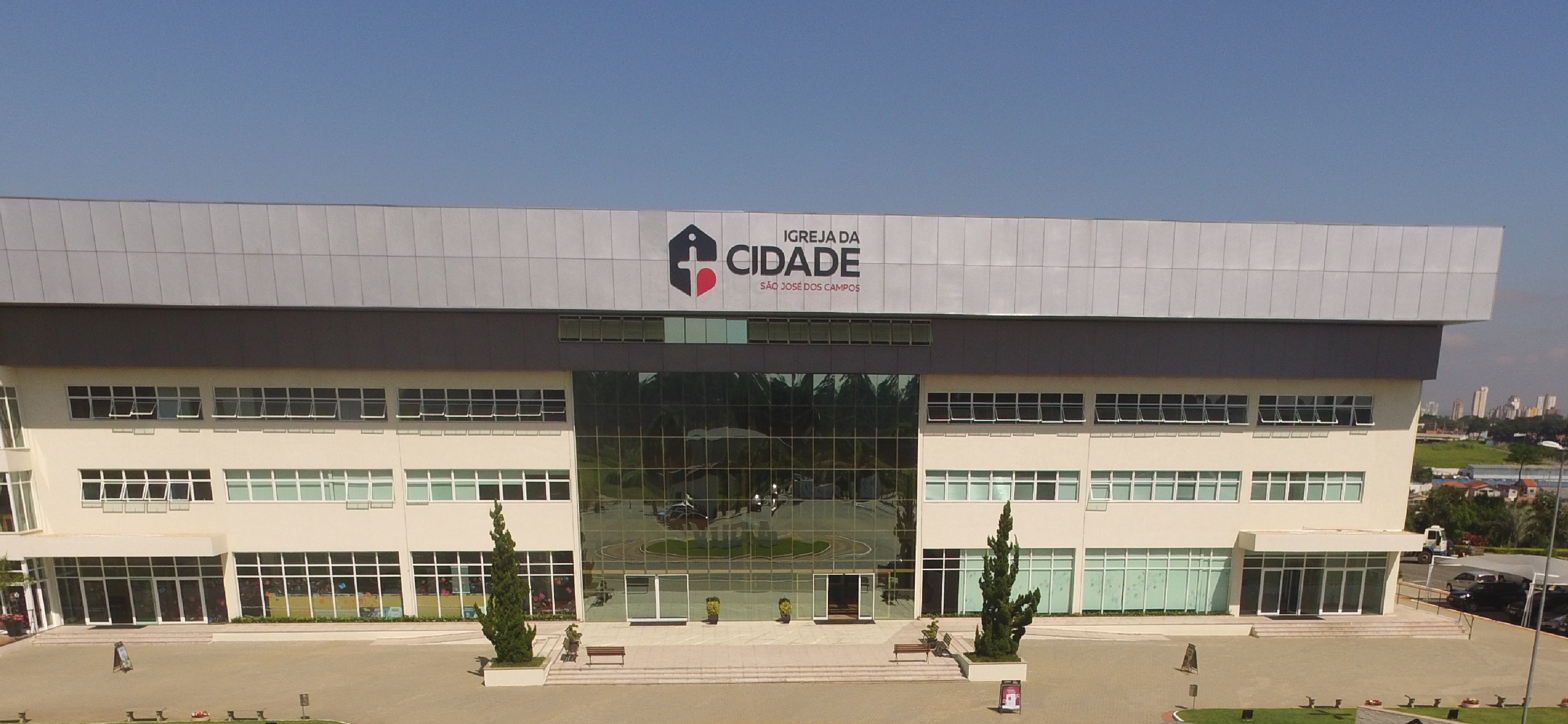
- The church building
- City Church
- 23.1939°S 45.8600°W
- Location: São José dos Campos, São Paulo, Brazil
- Country: Brazil
- Denomination: Baptist
- Website: igrejadacidade.net

History
- Founded: 1942

Specifications
- Capacity: 6,000

City Church (Portuguese: Igreja da Cidade) is an evangelical multi-site megachurch based in São José dos Campos, São Paulo, Brazil. It is affiliated with the Brazilian Baptist Convention and Baptist World Alliance. Its senior pastor is Carlito Paes. The church often achieves an attendance of up to 20,000 people.

== History ==
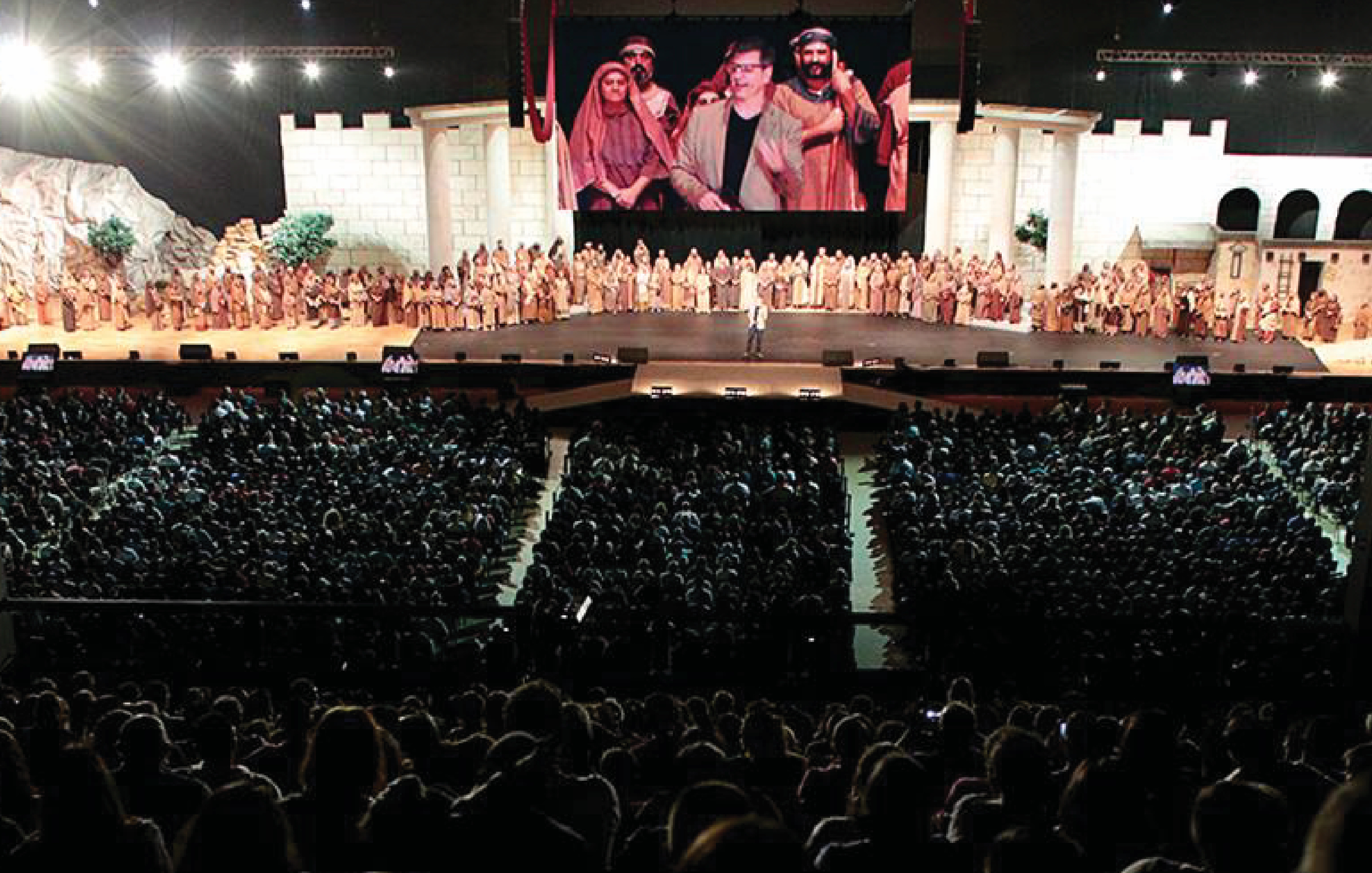
Show on the life of Jesus in 2017

The church was founded in 1942 under the name of Igreja Evangélica Batista de São José dos Campos. In 1982, it was renamed Primeira Igreja Batista em São José dos Campos. Since 2003, it hosted a show about the life of Jesus Christ for Easter which takes place every year. In 2013, it dedicated a new building with two auditoriums including a 6,000-seat auditorium, a sports complex, restaurants, offices and an elementary and secondary school, Colégio Inspire. In 2015, it had opened 9 campuses in different cities of Brazil and took its current name Igreja da Cidade. In 2023, it achieved 20,000 members, and 28 campuses.

== Beliefs ==
The Church has a Baptist confession of faith and is a member of the Brazilian Baptist Convention.

== See also ==
- List of the largest evangelical megachurches
- List of the largest evangelical church auditoriums
