= Evangelical feast =

The five evangelical feasts or feast days are Christmas, Good Friday, Easter, Ascension, and Pentecost. Most Continental Reformed churches continued to celebrate these feast days while largely discarding the rest of the liturgical calendar and emphasizing weekly celebration of the Lord's Day. Reformed churches in the Palatinate and the Netherlands also celebrated the Circumcision of Christ (1 January). Historically, the Genevan church and the Church of Scotland did not celebrate any holiday but Sunday - however feast days are commonplace in both denominations now. The Church of England retained twenty-seven holy days. As a result of disputes between Puritans and high churchmen over the Book of Common Prayer, which the Puritans refused to adopt because they believed it violated their liberty of conscience, they refused to celebrate any holidays besides the Lord's Day. These disputes spread into the Dutch Reformed Church, where there were intermittent battles over celebration of Christmas. Noncontinental Reformed Protestants continued to avoid celebrating feast days until the twentieth century.
