= Brazilian Baptist Convention =

Mainline Baptist denomination in Brazil

- Convenção Batista Brasileira
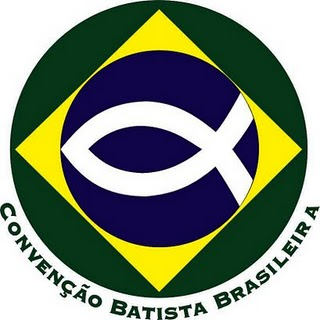
- Classification: Protestant
- Orientation: Baptist
- Theology: Evangelical Baptist
- Associations: Baptist World Alliance
- Headquarters: Rio de Janeiro, Brazil
- Origin: 1907
- Branched from: International Mission Board
- Separations: Assemblies of God in Brazil (1911); National Baptist Convention, Brazil (1967)
- Congregations: 9,238
- Members: 1,814,158
- Missionary organization: Junta de Missões Mundiais
- Seminaries: 3
- Official website: convencaobatista.com.br

The Brazilian Baptist Convention (Portuguese: Convenção Batista Brasileira) is the main Baptist denomination in Brazil. It is affiliated with the Baptist World Alliance. The headquarters is in Rio de Janeiro.

== History ==
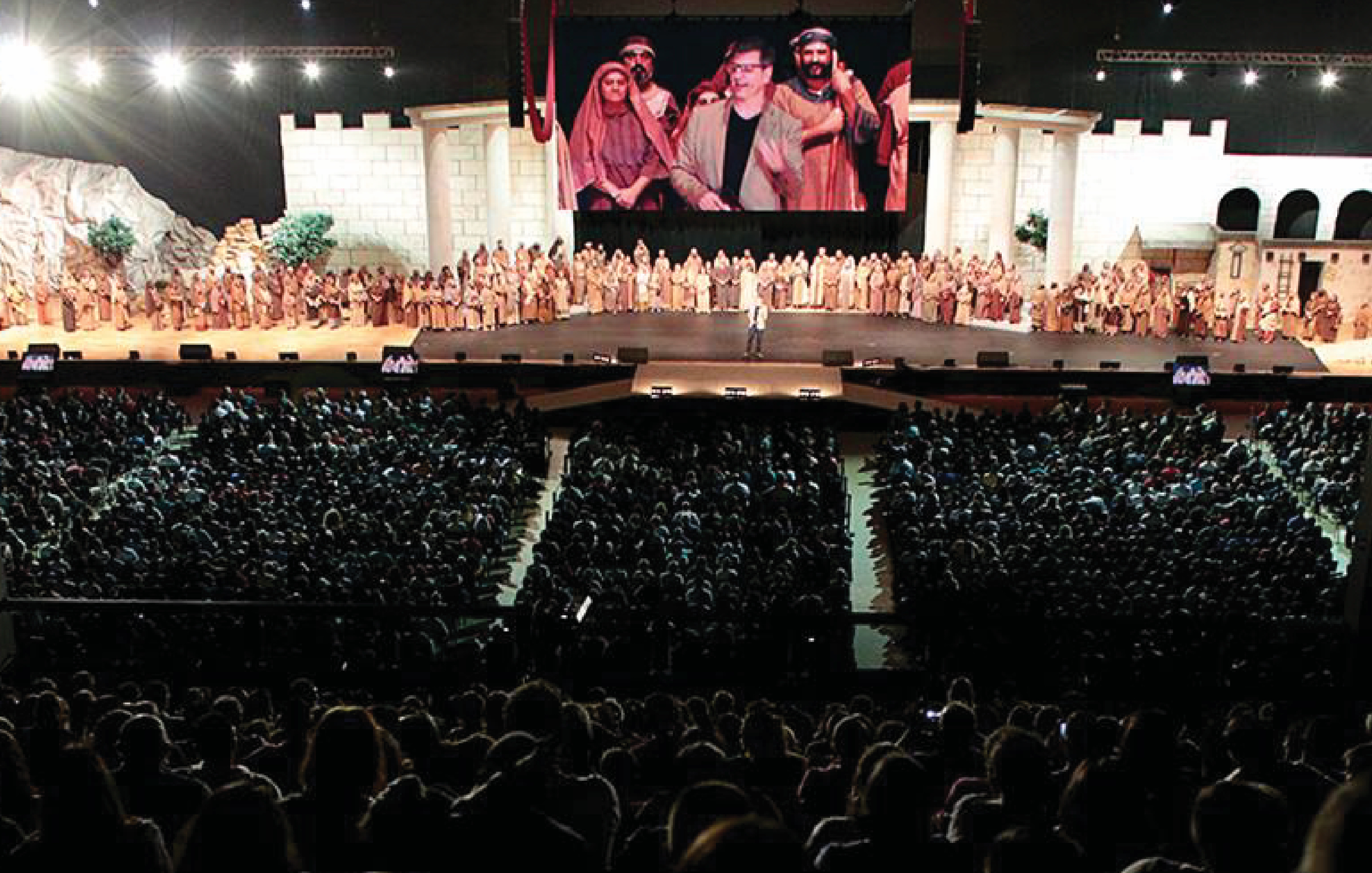
Show on the life of Jesus at City Church in São José dos Campos, affiliated to the Convention, 2017.

The Brazilian Baptist Convention has its origins in the establishment of the first Baptist Church in Salvador (Bahia) in 1882, by an American mission of the International Mission Board. It was founded in 1907.

According to a census published by the association in 2025, it claimed 9,238 churches and 1,814,158 members.

== Missionary organization ==
The convention has a missionary organization, Junta de Missões Mundiais.

== Humanitarian organization ==
The Convention coordinates several social programs, through the "Missões Nacionais" especially for the rehabilitation of drug addicts, dance and sports and for young people from disadvantaged neighborhoods and housing orphaned children.

== Schools ==
The convention has 17 affiliated primary and secondary schools gathered in the Rede Batista de Educação.

It has 3 affiliated theological institutes.

== Controversies ==
In 1965, the Convention proceeded to the excommunication of 165 churches teaching the beliefs of the charismatic movement.

== See also ==
- Protestantism in Brazil
- List of Baptist confessions of faith
- Believer's Baptism
- Southern Baptist Convention
- Assemblies of God in Brazil
