= Wilder (name) =

Wilder is an English and German surname, sometimes used as a given name, meaning "untamed" or "wild", a wild, free, or natural state or existence, also passionately eager or enthusiastic.

== People with the given name ==
- Wilder D. Baker (1890–1975), United States Navy admiral
- Wilder Dwight Bancroft (1867–1953), American chemist
- Wilder Calderón (born 1947), Peruvian politician
- Wilder Cartagena (born 1994), Peruvian footballer
- Wilder W. Crane Jr. (1928–1985), American politician
- Wilder D. Foster (1819–1873), American politician
- Wilder Guisao (born 1991), Colombian footballer
- Wilder W. Hartley (1901–1970), American politician
- Wilder Hobson (1906–1964), American writer and musician
- Wilder Medina (born 1981), Colombian footballer
- Wilder Metcalf (1855–1935), United States Army general and politician
- Wilder Penfield (1891–1976), American-Canadian neurosurgeon
- Wilder Smith (1835–1891), American minister and writer
- Wilder Weir (born 1983), Canadian television host
- Wilder Zabala (born 1982), Bolivian footballer

== People with the surname ==
- Wilder (surname)

== Fictional characters ==
- Alex Wilder, a fictional character appearing in Marvel Comics
- Harry Wilder, a fictional character in the Case Closed
- Wilder (Transformers), a fictional character
- Zelos Wilder, a fictional character in the video game Tales of Symphonia
- Kate Wilder, a fictional character in the video game The Dark Pictures Anthology: The Devil in Me
- Van Wilder, a fictional character in the film National Lampoon's Van Wilder (2002)

== See also ==
- Wylder (name)
- Wilders (surname)
- Wild (surname)
- Wilde
