= Wylde (surname) =

Wylde is a surname. Notable people with the surname include:

- Arnold Wylde (1880–1958), Bishop of Bathurst NSW Australia
- Chris Wylde (born 1976), American actor
- Edmund Wylde (1618–1695), English politician
- George Wylde I (1550–1616), English lawyer and politician
- George Wylde II (1594–1650), English lawyer and politician
- Gordon Wylde (born 1964), Scottish football manager and player
- Gregg Wylde (born 1991), Scottish footballer
- Harold Wylde (1888–1975), South Australian organist
- Henry Wylde (1822–1890), English musician
- John Wylde (1781–1859), judge in Australia and chief justice in South Africa
- John Wilde (jurist) aka John Wylde (1590–1669), English lawyer and politician, chief baron of the Exchequer
- Michael Wylde (born 1987), English footballer
- Peter Wylde (born 1965), American equestrian
- Rodger Wylde (born 1954), English footballer
- Ronald Wylde (1913–2000), Scottish athlete
- Thomas Wylde (1670–1740), English politician and administrator
- Thomas Wylde (clothier) (1508–1559), English clothier and politician
- William Wylde (1794–1877), British army general
- William Henry Wylde (civil servant) (1819–1909), British Foreign Office administrator
- William Henry Wylde (politician) (1817–unknown), Nova Scotian politician
- Zakk Wylde (born 1967–), American musician

== See also ==
- Wylder (name)
- Wild (surname)
- Wilder (name)
