= Wild (surname) =

Wild is a surname. Notable people with the surname include:

- Allan Wild (1927–2019), New Zealand architect and academic
- Anke Wild (born 1967), German field hockey player
- Cyril H.D. Wild (1908–1946), British Army officer
- David Wild (born 1961), American arts critic
- Dölf Wild (born 1954), Swiss historian and archaeologist
- Earl Wild (1915–2010), American pianist
- Ed Wild (1935–2020), Canadian basketball player
- Edward A. Wild (1825–1891), American homeopathic doctor and US Civil War General
- Sir Ernest Wild (1869–1934), British Judge and Conservative Member of Parliament
- Frank Wild (1873–1939), British Antarctic explorer
- Franz Wild (1791–1860), Austrian opera singer
- H. Catherine Wild Skinner, (1931-2025), American geologist
- Gerald Wild (1907–1996), Australian MP and government minister
- Hans-Peter Wild (born 1941), chairman of the WILD GmbH & Co.KG
- Harry J. Wild (1901–1961) American cinematographer
- Heinrich Wild (1877–1951), Swiss designer of geodetic instruments
- Heinrich von Wild (1833–1902), Swiss physicist and meteorologist
- Ian Wild (born 1990), American gridiron long snapper in American and Canadian football
- Jack Wild (1952–2006), British actor
- Jessica Wild (born 1980), Puerto Rican drag queen
- John Daniel Wild (1902–1972), American philosopher
- John Paul Wild (1923–2008), British-born Australian scientist
- Jonathan Wild (c.1683 – 1725), eighteenth-century English crime boss
- Kirsten Wild (born 1982), Dutch road and track cyclist
- Paul Wild (1925–2014), Swiss astronomer
- Peter Wild (1940–2009), University of Arizona English professor and poet
- Peter J. Wild (born 1939), Swiss electronics engineer
- Rebeca Wild (1939 - 2015) German educator and author in Ecuador
- Rudolf Wild (1904–1995), founder of the WILD GmbH & Co.KG
- Stephen Wild (born 1981), British rugby league footballer
- Susan Wild (born 1957), American politician
- Thiago Seyboth Wild (born 2000), Brazilian tennis player
- Vic Wild (born 1986), American-Russian snowboarder
- Vivienne Wild, British astrophysicist
- Wolfgang Wild (curator) (born 1970), English curator and writer
- Wolfgang Wild (physicist) (1930–2023), German nuclear physicist, academic administrator and politician

== See also ==
- House of Wild, a Saxon noble family
- Lacey Wildd (born 1968), American model and actress
- Wilde, a list of people with the surname
- De Wilde, a list of people with the surname
- Wylde (surname), a list of people
