= Tomasz Hueckel =

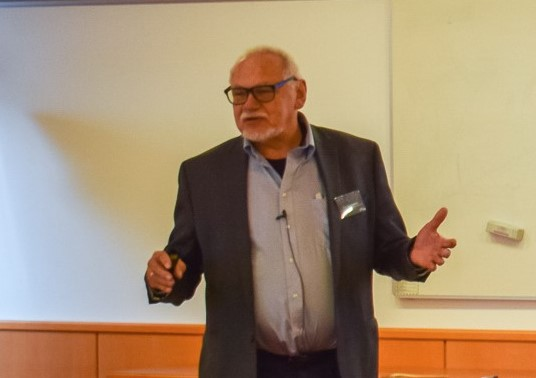
- Education: Polish Academy of Sciences
- Scientific career
- Workplaces: Duke University
- Website: https://cee.duke.edu/faculty/tomasz-hueckel

Tomasz Hueckel is an American scientist and engineer, born and educated in Poland. He is a professor of Civil and Environmental Engineering at Duke University, Durham, NC, USA. He is also a co-founder and editor-in-chief of the Elsevier Geomechanics for Energy and the Environment journal. Tomasz Hueckel is the son of Stanisław Hückel, a professor of maritime, harbor and foundation engineering at Gdańsk University of Technology in Poland. Hueckel is active in the field of multi-physics geomechanics, with applications to underground energy, resource and environmental geomechanics.

== Biography ==
Hueckel studied at Gdańsk University of Technology, Poland. In 1974 he obtained his PhD degree in Applied Mechanics from the Institute of Fundamental Technological Research of the Polish Academy of Sciences in Warsaw. In 1985 he earned D.Sc. in Physical Sciences from the Polytechnic School and Grenoble Institute of Technology, France. After research stay at the Polish Academy of Sciences in Warsaw he moved to Italy, where he taught at the University of Rome and the Polytechnic University of Milan. Before moving to Duke in 1987, he worked with ISMES, in Bergamo, Italy, on the topic of nuclear waste storage.

Hueckel is the recipient of 2008 John Booker Medal from IACMAG. In 2004 he received the Fellowship of Excellence for Visiting Professors and Researchers from the Government of Catalonia, and the Fellowship from the Fonds National de la Recherche Scientifique in Belgium in 2003. On May 16, 2025, he received the title of Doctor Honoris Causa from the University of Montpellier.

== Publications ==
His most cited publications are :

- Peron H, Hueckel T, Laloui L, Hu L. Fundamentals of desiccation cracking of fine-grained soils: experimental characterisation and mechanisms identification. Canadian Geotechnical Journal. 2009 Oct;46(10):1177-201.(Cited 340 times, according to Google Scholar.)
- Bigoni D, Hueckel T. Uniqueness and localization—I. Associative and non-associative elastoplasticity. International Journal of Solids and structures. 1991 Jan 1;28(2):197-213.(Cited 338 times, according to Google Scholar)
- Hueckel TA. Water–mineral interaction in hygromechanics of clays exposed to environmental loads: a mixture-theory approach. Canadian Geotechnical Journal. '1992 Dec 1;29(6):1071-86. (Cited 169 times, according to Google Scholar.)
- Peron H, Laloui L, Hueckel T, Hu LB. Desiccation cracking of soils. European journal of environmental and civil engineering. 2009 Sep 1;13(7-8):869-88.(Cited 150 times, according to Google Scholar.)
