= Wilde =

- Language: Old English

Origin
- Meaning: "high spirited, a leader"; "a person worth of high respect, dictator"; (descriptive) "person who has attained a higher form"; "from an area of educated beings: a classist" (residential)
- Region of origin: England

Other names
- Variant forms: Whilde, Wylde, Wyldes, Weald, Weild, Weld, Welds, Wyeld, Wield

Wilde is a surname. Notable people with the name include:

== In arts and entertainment ==
=== In film, television, and theatre ===
- Andrew Wilde (actor), English actor
- Barbie Wilde (born 1960), Canadian actress
- Brian Wilde (1927–2008), British actor
- Cornel Wilde (1912–1989), American actor and film director
- Hagar Wilde (1905–1971), screenplay writer
- Lois Wilde (1907–1995), American actress, model, dancer, and beauty contest winner
- Lucy Wilde, Anti-Villain League agent and wife of Gru in the Despicable Me franchise
- Marty Wilde (born 1939), British rock and roll singer and actor; father of Kim and Ricky Wilde
- Olivia Wilde (born 1984), American actress
- Patrick Wilde, British television, stage and screenwriter
- Sonya Wilde (born 1937), American actress
- Ted Wilde (1893–1929), comedy writer and director of silent movies
- Nick Wilde, he is a red fox in both Zootopia and Zootopia 2

=== In music ===
- Andrew Wilde (pianist) (born 1965), English classical pianist
- Danny Wilde (musician) (born 1956), American musician and founding member of The Rembrandts
- David Wilde (1935–2025), British pianist and composer
- Jinian Wilde, British singer, part of Uniting Nations and other musical projects
- Kim Wilde (born 1960), British pop singer and pop culture figure
- Marty Wilde (born 1939), British rock and roll singer and actor; father of Kim and Ricky Wilde
- Ricky Wilde (born 1961), British songwriter, musician, and record producer
- Wilbur Wilde (born 1955), Australian saxophonist

=== In other arts ===
- Eduardo Wilde (1844–1913), Argentine politician, writer, and physician
- Jane Wilde (1821–1896), Irish political activist, poet, and folklorist; mother of Oscar Wilde
- John Wilde (artist) (1919–2006), American painter associated with Magic Realism
- Liz Wilde (born 1971), American radio personality
- Nurit Wilde (born 1971), Israeli-born photographer, socialite, and occasional actress
- Oscar Wilde (1854–1900), Irish poet and playwright
- Stuart Wilde (1946–2013), British writer

== In government, law, and politics ==
- Eduardo Wilde (1844–1913), Argentine politician, writer, and physician
- Fran Wilde (born 1948), New Zealand politician
- James Plaisted Wilde, Baron Penzance (1816–1899), British judge, rose-breeder, and proponent of the Baconian theory of the works of Shakespeare
- John Wilde (jurist) (1590–1669), English lawyer and politician
- Louis J. Wilde (1865–1924), American banker and politician
- Thomas Wilde, 1st Baron Truro (1782–1858), Lord Chancellor of England
- William Allan Wilde (1827–1902), American publisher and politician

== In sport ==
- Federico Wilde (1909–?), Argentine footballer
- Jimmy Wilde (1892–1969), Welsh world boxing champion
- Joaquin Wilde (born 1986), American professional wrestler
- Sam Wilde, English rugby league footballer
- Walter Wilde (1908–1968), Somerset cricketer

== In science and technology ==
- Henry Wilde (engineer) (1833–1919), British engineer and inventor of the self-energizing dynamo
- Henry Tingle Wilde (1872–1912), English chief officer on the RMS Titanic
- Krzysztof Wilde (born 1966), Polish engineer, rector of Gdańsk University of Technology
- William Wilde (1815–1876), Irish eye and ear surgeon, writer on medicine, archaeology and folklore, father of Oscar Wilde
- Winston Wilde, American sexologist

== In other fields ==
- Dorothy Wilde (1895–1941), Anglo-Irish socialite
- Maud Wilde (1880–1965), physician, organizational founder, and author
- Michael Wilde (born 1952), English businessman

== See also ==
- De Wilde
- Dewilde
- Wild (surname), list of people with the surname Wild
- Vilde
