= Grand Embassy of Peter the Great =

1697–98 Russian diplomatic mission to Western Europe

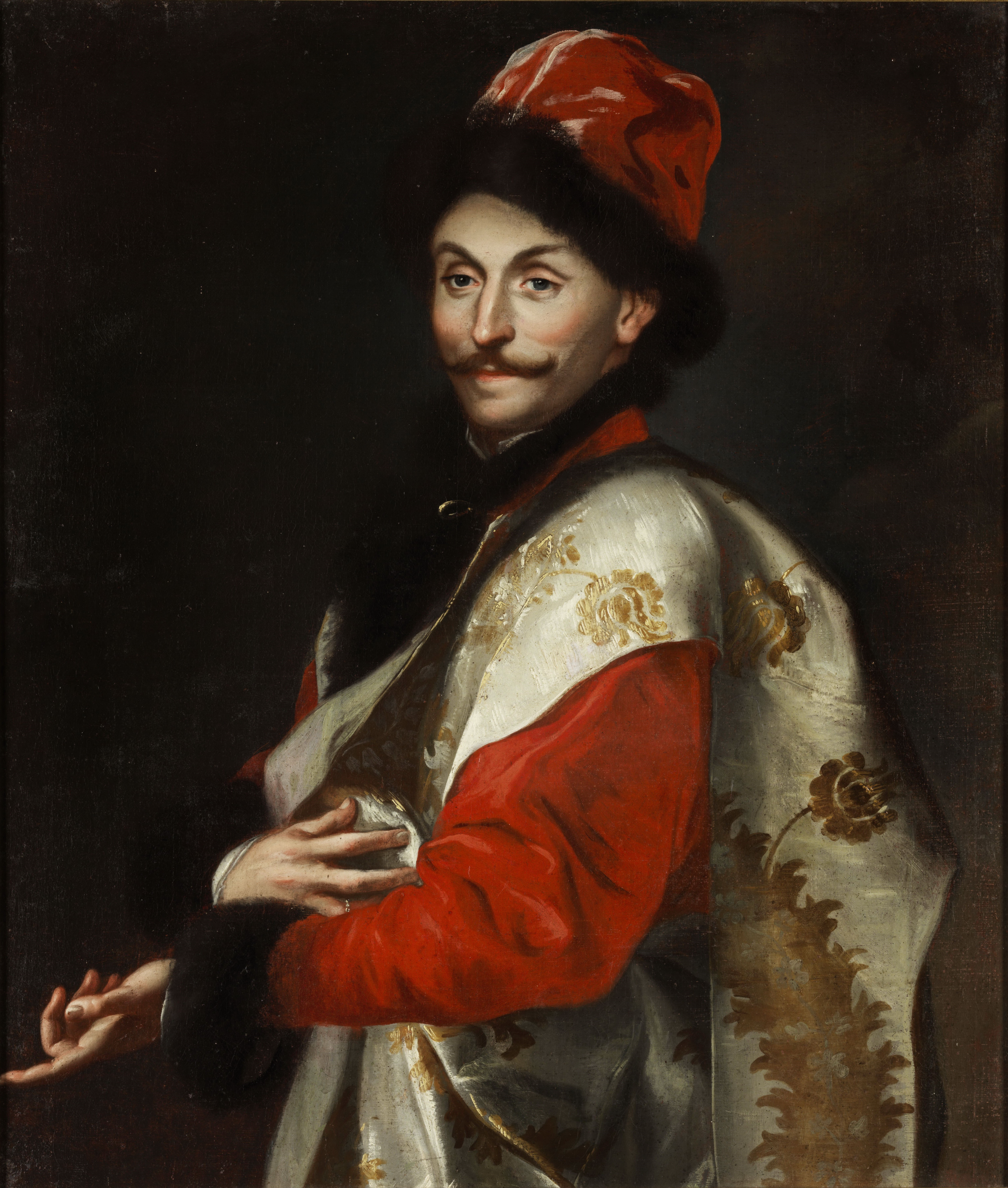
Member of Grand Embassy of Peter the Great by Flemish anonim (1697)

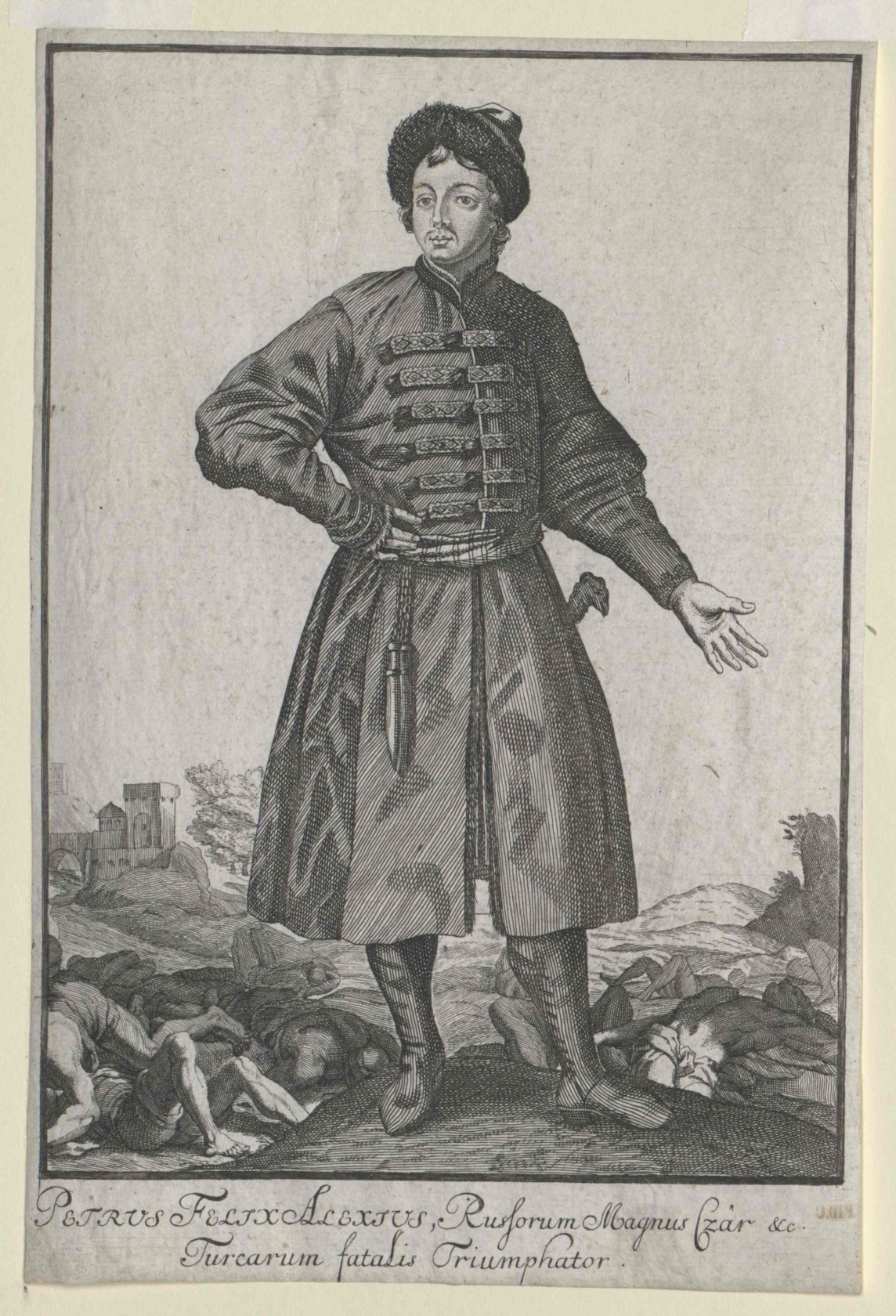
Peter in Russian dress during the Grand Embassy

The Grand Embassy (Russian: Вели́кое посо́льство, romanized: Velíkoye posól'stvo) was a Russian diplomatic mission to Western Europe from 9 March 1697 to 25 August 1698 led by Peter the Great.

== Description ==
In 1697 and 1698, Peter the Great embarked on his Grand Embassy. The primary goal of the mission was to strengthen and broaden the Holy League, Russia's alliance with a number of European countries against the Ottoman Empire in the Russian struggle for the northern coastline of the Black Sea. The tsar also sought to hire foreign specialists for the Russian service and to acquire military weapons.

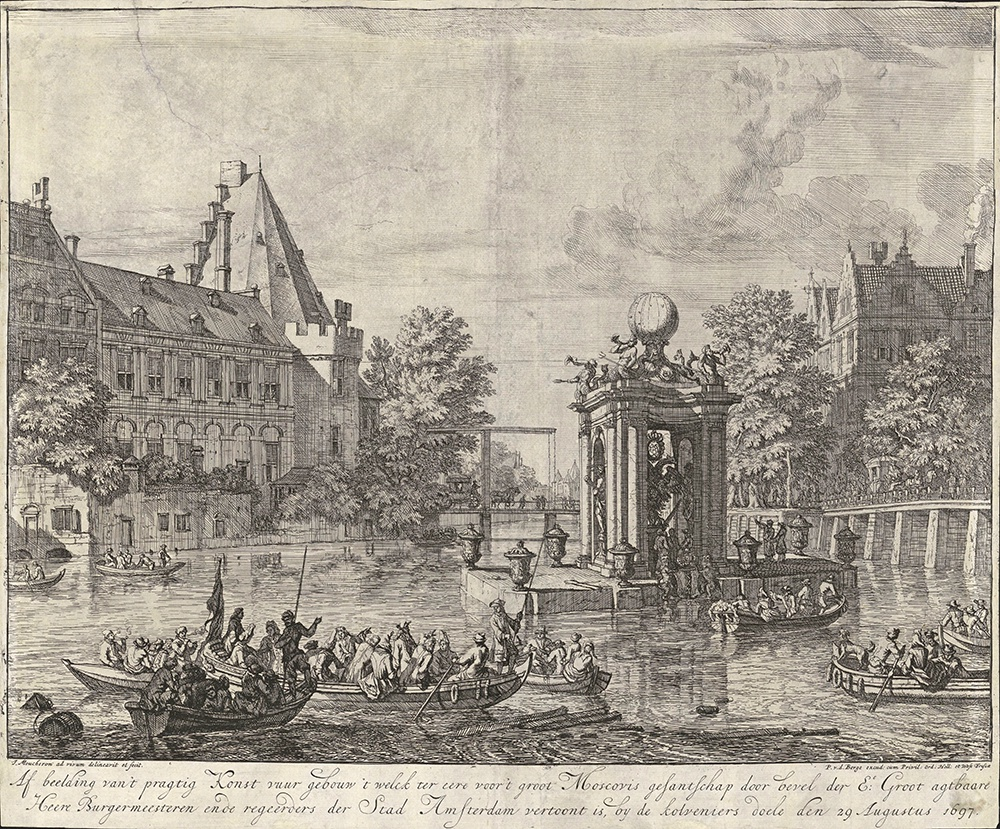
Grand Embassy arrives in Amsterdam. Spectacle on the Amstel river on 26 August

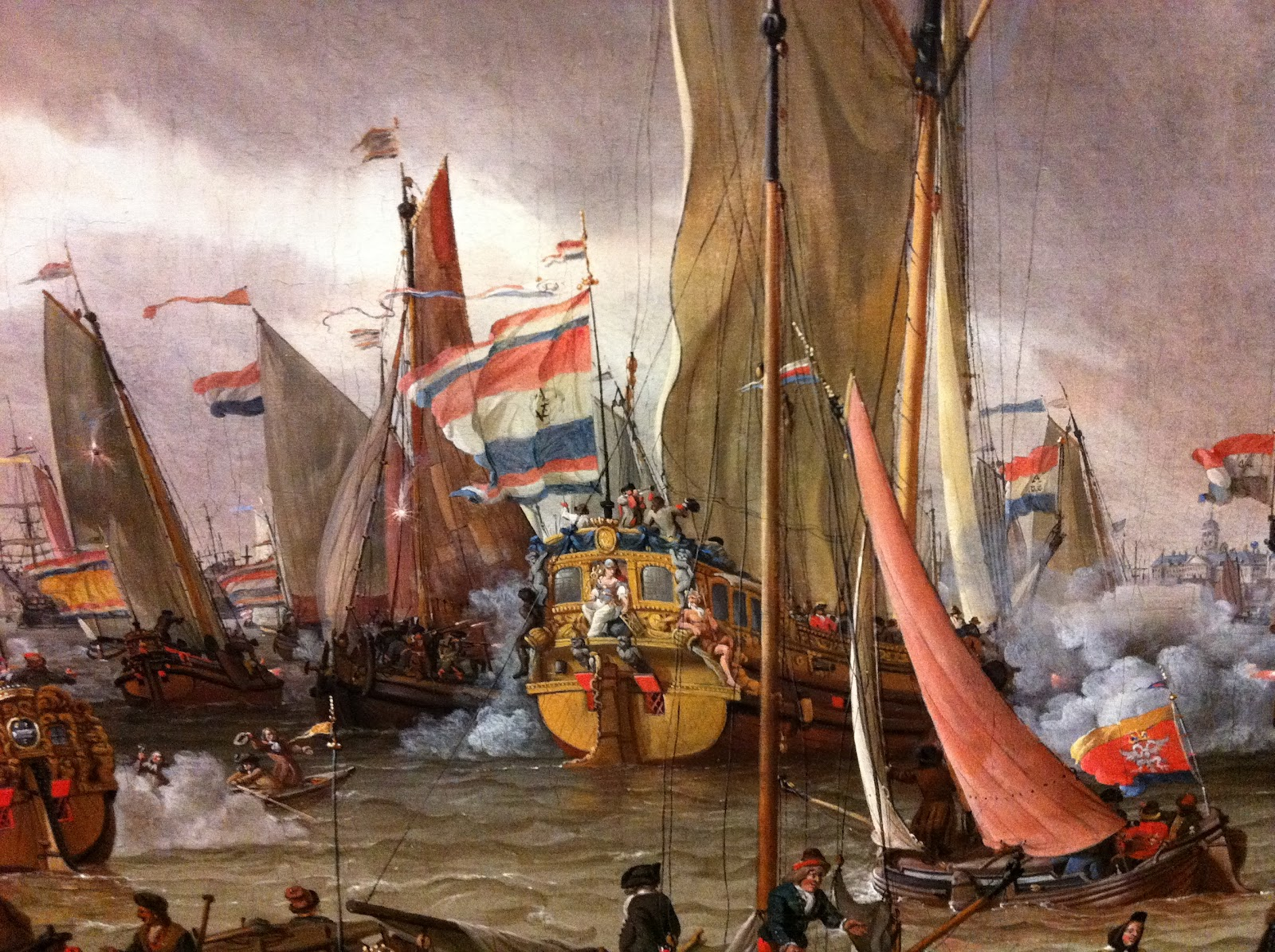
Practice fight of the Dutch Fleet in honour of the Czar, September 1697; by Abraham Storck

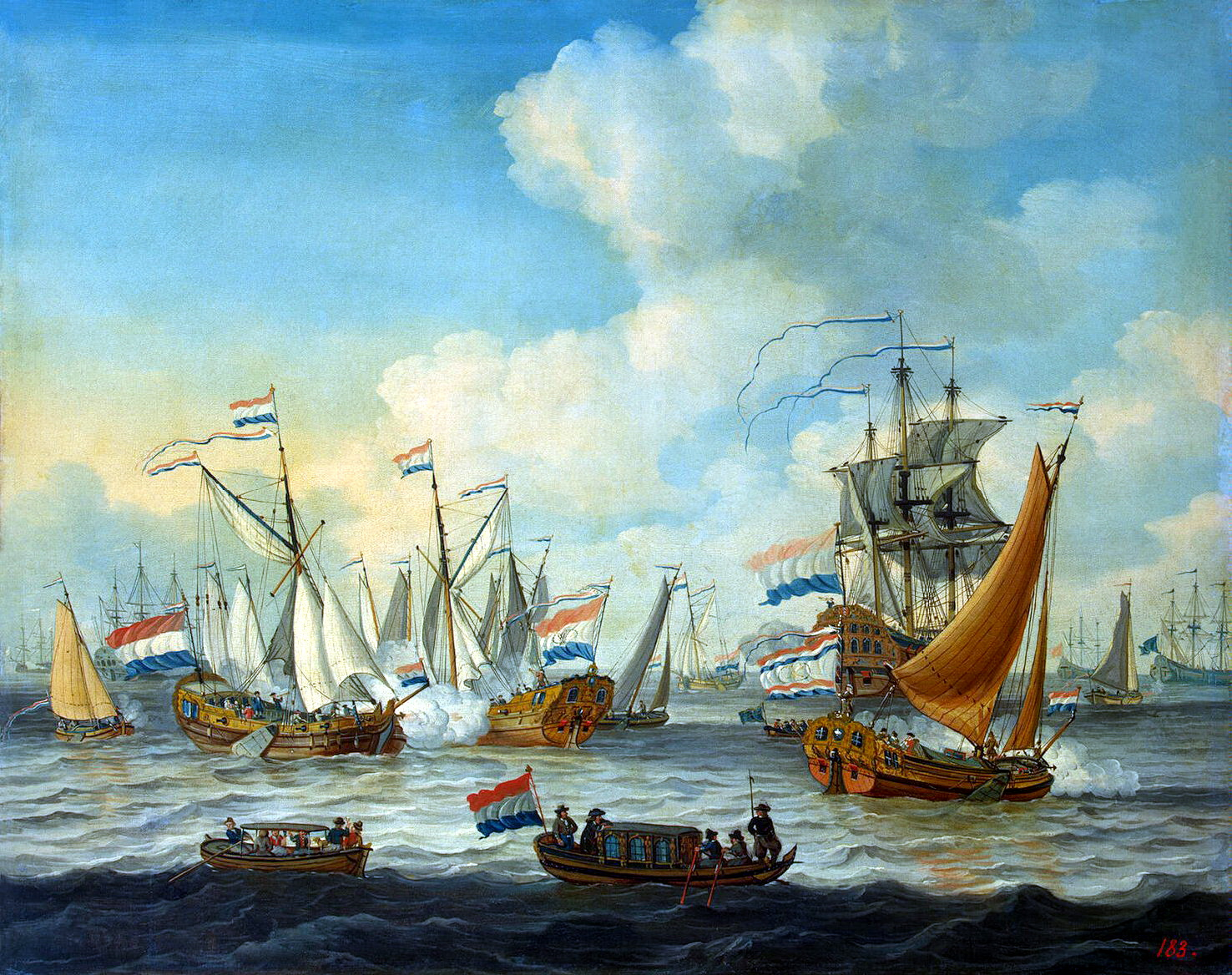
Adam Silo - Fleet Manoeuvres on the Zuiderzee on 1 September 1697

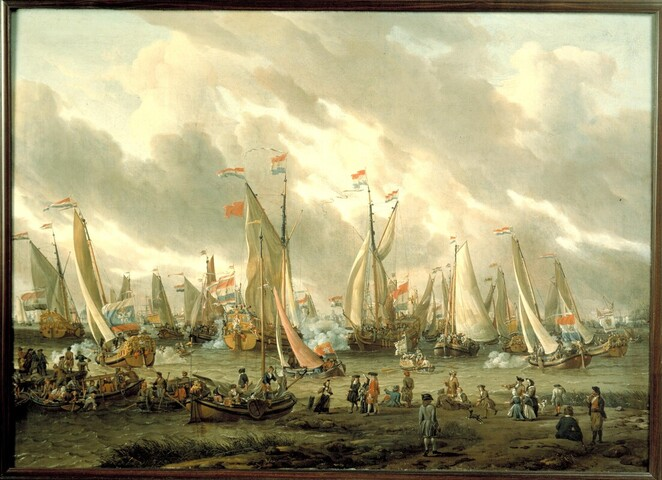
Abraham Storck - Spiegelgevecht op het IJ ter ere van het bezoek van tsaar Peter de Grote van Rusland, 1 september 1697 - A.0280 - Het Scheepvaartmuseum

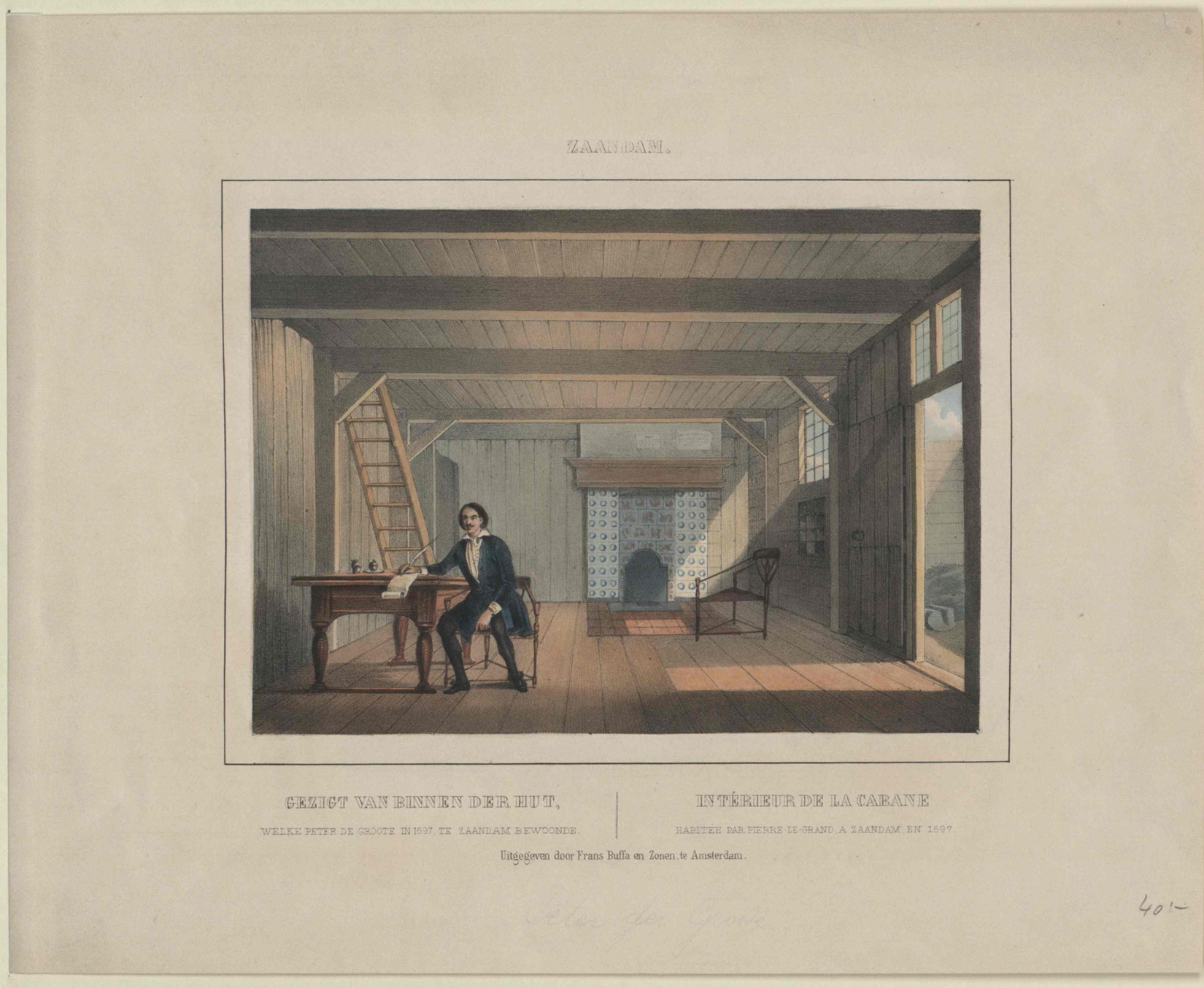
Peter I of Russia's house in Saardam

Officially, the Grand Embassy was headed by the "grand ambassadors" Franz Lefort, Fedor Golovin and Prokopy Voznitsyn. In fact, it was led by Peter himself, who went along incognito under the name of Peter Mikhailov. At 6 feet 8 inches (2.03 m) Peter was one of the tallest men in Europe, a fact very hard to disguise.

Peter conducted negotiations with Friedrich Casimir Kettler, the Duke of Courland, and concluded an alliance with King Frederick I of Prussia. He arrived in the Dutch Republic mid-August 1697, where he worked incognito as a shipbuilder from 1 September.

On 1 September Peter watched a mock fight which was repeated on his request several weeks later. While visiting the Amsterdam he learned to draw ships and to etch from Adam Silo and Ludolf Bakhuysen, painters of seascapes. Witsen introduced him to Frederik Ruysch, who taught him how to do sections, pull his subjects' teeth, and to catch butterflies. He met with Jan van der Heyden, the inventor of the fire hose. He visited Jacob de Wilde, who had a well-known collection of gems and coins, and his daughter Maria de Wilde made an engraving of the meeting between Peter and her father, providing visual evidence of "the beginning of the West European classical tradition in Russia". The Great Embassy visited the States General of the Netherlands to gain support against the Ottoman Empire in the Second Russo-Turkish War. When Peter did not receive this support, he left the hall and the astonished attendees, with his wig pulled over his head. On 16 January 1698 Peter organized a farewell party and invited Johan Huydecoper van Maarsseveen, who had to sit between Lefort and the Tsar and drink.

On 11 September or 9 November 1697 Peter met with William III, who governed both the Netherlands and England, and the States-General in October of that year. William was in Utrecht at the time. The encounter between the two rulers was recognized as a significant event (a medal to commemorate the occasion was created). In his desire for an alliance, Peter was prepared to support William in the Nine Years' War against France even though the final treaty would be signed nine days later.

Peter failed to expand the anti-Ottoman alliance. The Grand Embassy had to limit itself to acquiring different equipment and hiring foreign specialists especially in military and naval affairs. In October 1697, Antonie van Leeuwenhoek visited the Tsar on his boat, moored in the Schie or at the Arsenaal. On this occasion he presented the Tsar with an "eel-viewer", so Peter could study blood circulation whenever he wanted.

Following a personal invitation from William III, Peter sailed from the Dutch town of Hellevoetsluis on 18 January 1698 to visit England; the Tsar's stay would last 105 days.

== Visit to England ==
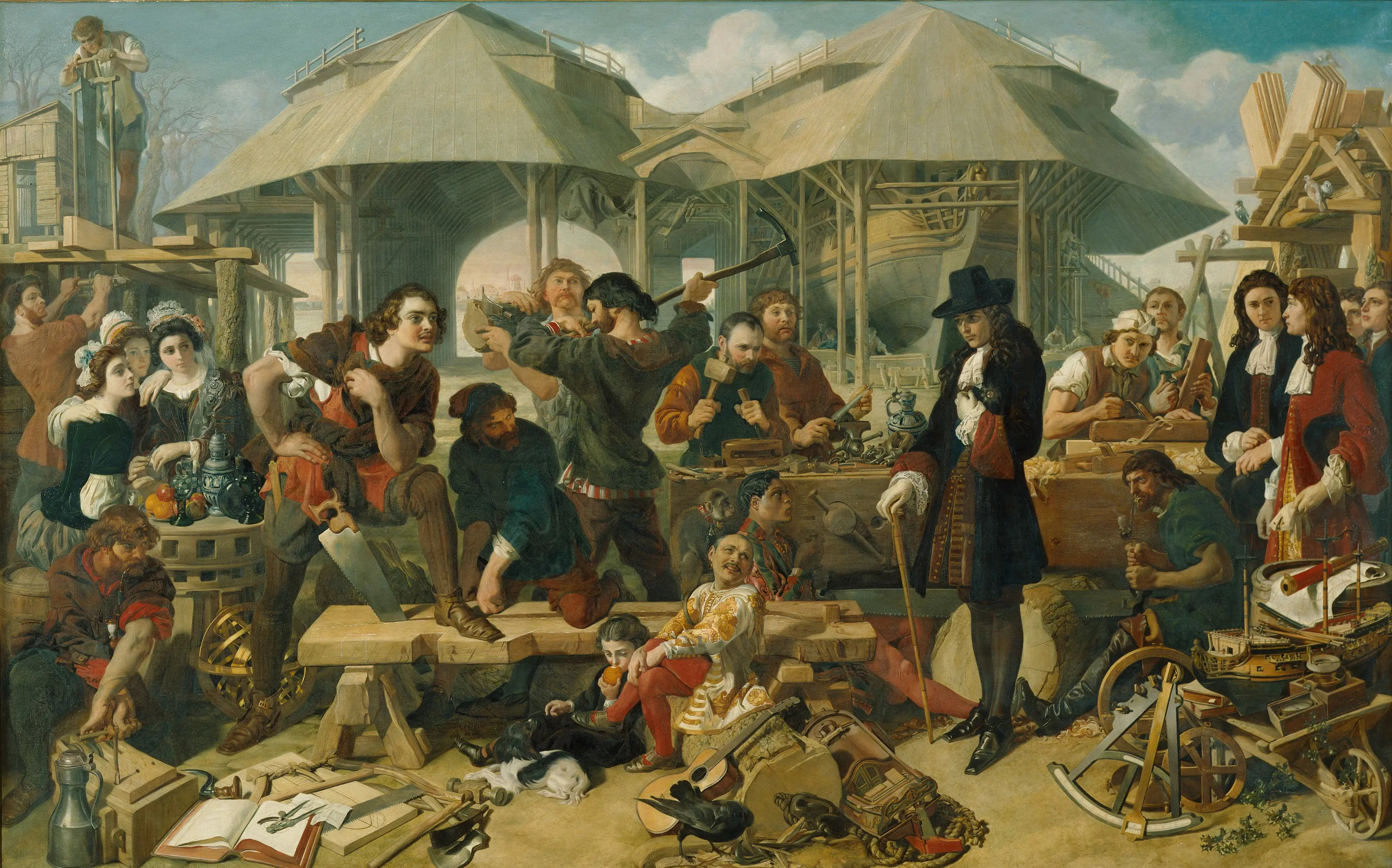
Peter the Great at Deptford Dockyard by Daniel Maclise

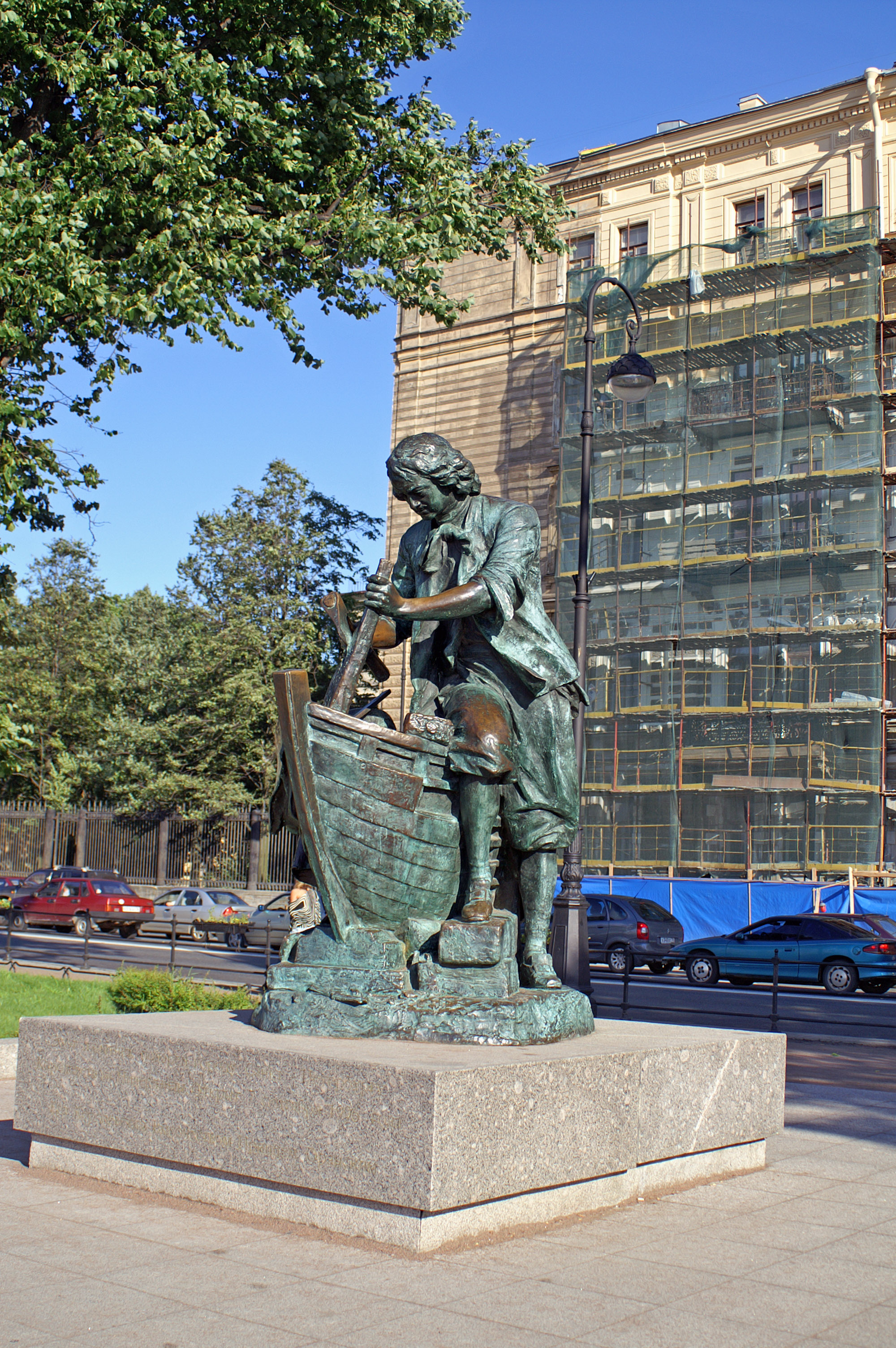
A statue of Peter I working incognito at a Dutch wharf.

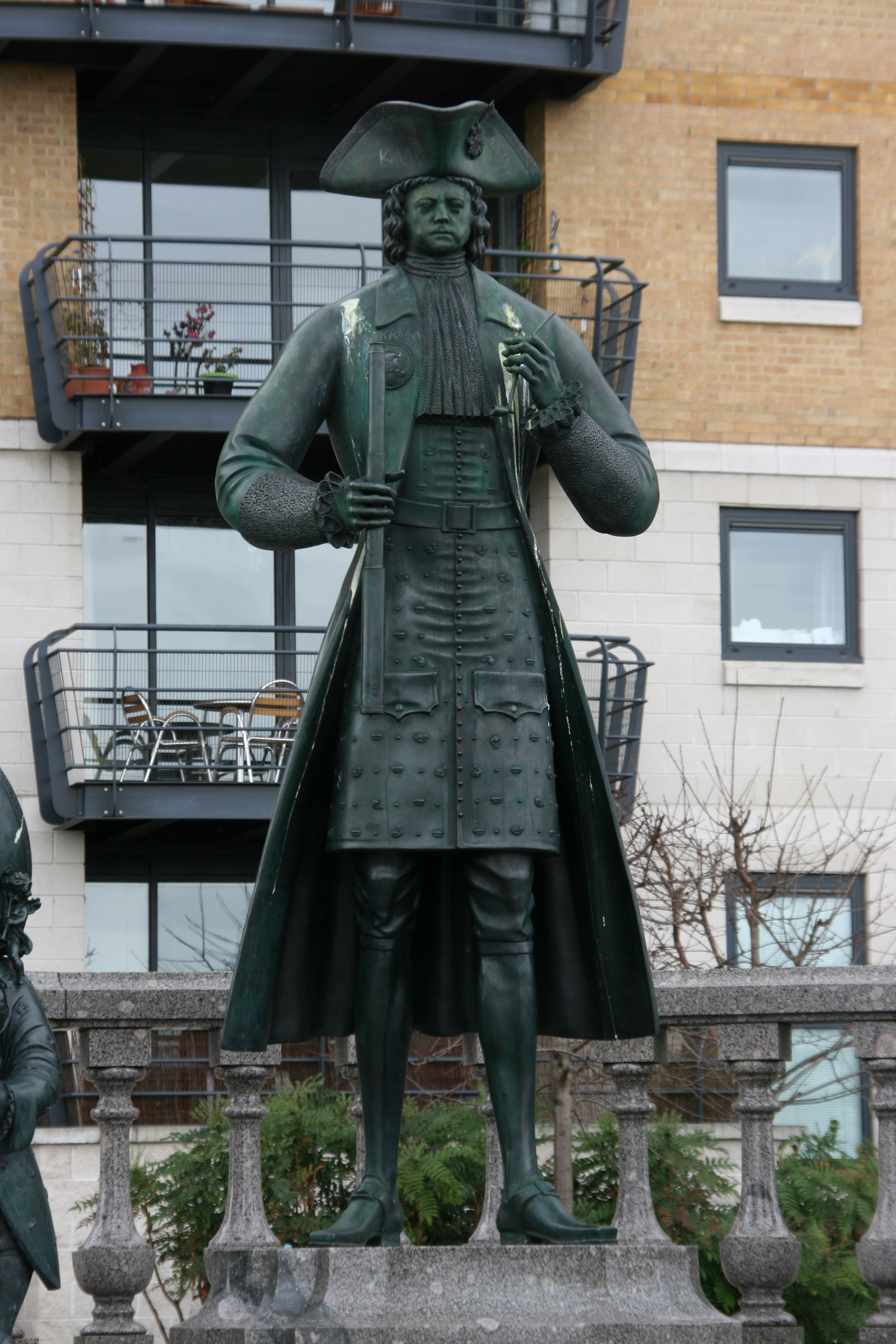
Statue of Peter the Great, Deptford

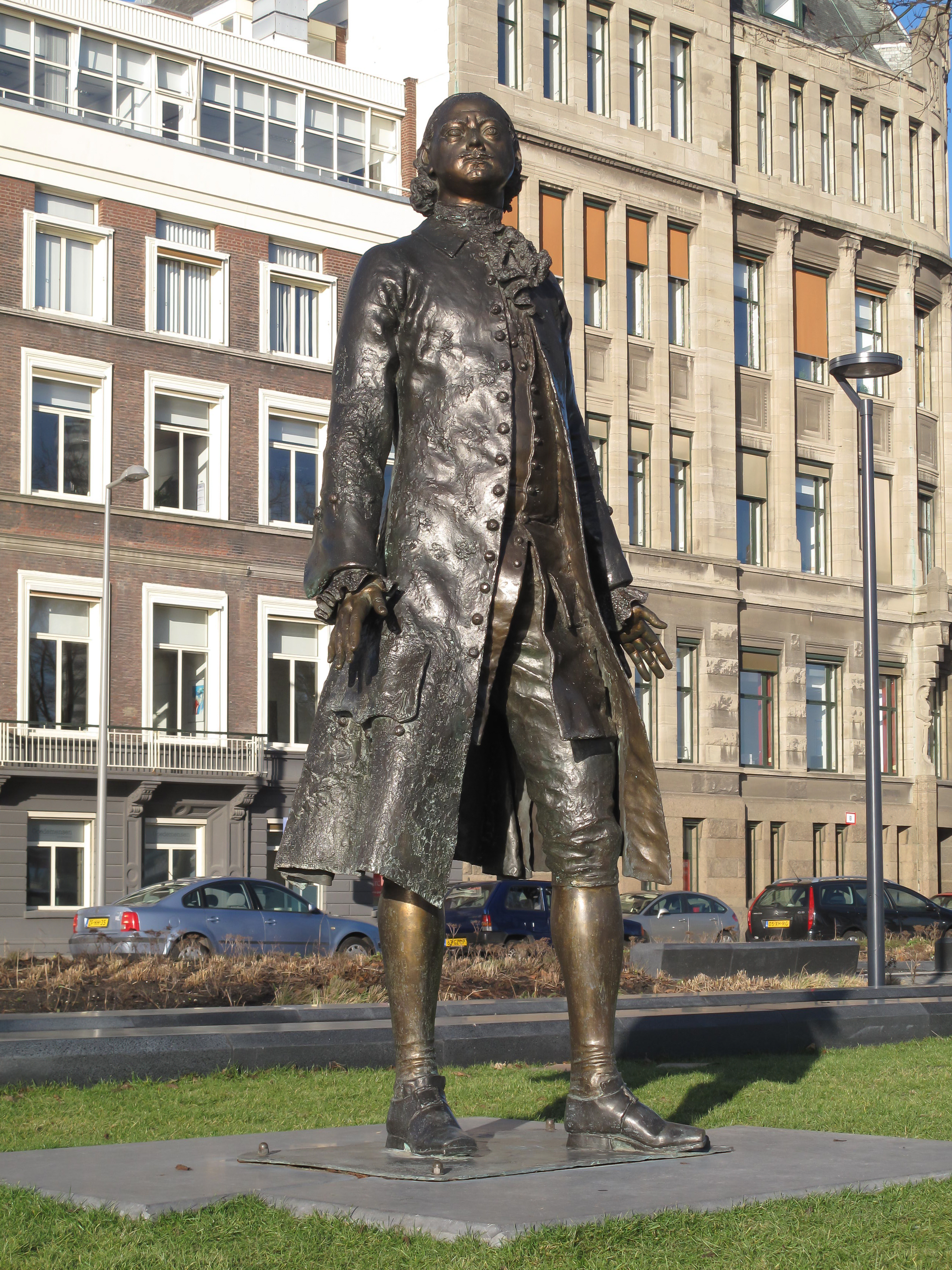
A statue of Peter in Rotterdam

Peter and part of the Embassy arrived in England on 11 January 1698 (Old Style), their four month stay would last until 21 April. His entourage included four chamberlains, three interpreters, two clocksmiths, a cook, a priest, six trumpeters, 70 soldiers as tall as their monarch, four dwarves, and a monkey. The party landed in London at the York House Watergate; the ornate riverside entranceway was built in 1626 for George Villiers, 2nd Duke of Buckingham as a private gateway from his grand residence "York House" to his personal mooring on the river.

Peter met with King William and his court frequently on informal bases, keeping to his preferred method of traveling through Europe. By February, the English king inquired on the date of Peter's departure after tactics of cutting the Russians daily allowances and denying their requests for horse and a carriage didn't work. The Russian czar eventually picked a date in end of April.

At the behest of the king, Peregrine Osborne, Marquess of Carmarthen (later Duke of Leeds) designed a yacht for him, which was named the Royal Transport. Carmarthen also became a drinking companion to the tsar. Peter was delighted that the Englishman could keep up with his consumption of alcohol. A legend was created of their drinking: the pub the two men frequented changed its name to "Czar of Muscovy" or "Czar's Head", according to different sources.

Peter visited the Royal Observatory, the Royal Mint, the Royal Society, the University of Oxford, as well as several shipyards and artillery plants. He studied the English techniques of city-building. He would later use that knowledge to great effect at Saint Petersburg. In Deptford's royal dockyards, he acquired skills that later helped him raise a Russian fleet; he studied in the Royal Observatory to improve Russian navigational skills; in Woolwich Arsenal he learned how to produce artillery. Although Peter had numerous opportunities to spend time with Isaac Newton, Christopher Wren, and Edmund Halley, he did not meet with them.

Instead, he concentrated on his goal of acquiring valuable technology that "had ultimately proved frustrating" in the Netherlands. The Dutch had one of the most sophisticated shipyard operations in Europe but most of their work method were not written down. Instead, in Peter's own words, they used "measure of intuition and unwritten custom that was difficult to codify." The decision to visit Britain was easily made when Peter heard that the British shipyard employed "art and science" practices that could be learned in a short time.

Peter did meet with other notable intellectuals. While in Britain, he had an affair with Letitia Cross.

Although at first denying audience to them, Peter eventually took interest in the Quakers. The elders of the faith took note of that by sending five of their statesmen including Thomas Story and William Penn to meet with him. The Quakers presented Peter with Barclay’s Apology and other Quaker works. Peter challenged the Quaker delegation on the usefulness of their faith to a state as the adherents to the religion would not join the armed forces. The delegation pointed out that their faith values were hard work, honesty, and innovation. The Russian monarch was suitably impressed by the meeting and attended, unannounced, the Gracechurch St Meeting the following Sunday. Unlike the conversations with others through the use of an interpreter, Penn and Peter interacted in German, the language the two men knew well and the house on Norfolk Street where Peter stayed had a "few years before been the refuge of William Penn." At the time, Penn was the largest non-royal landowner in the world. The men met twice and afterwards Penn wrote a letter reminding absolute ruler of Russia that, "If thou wouldst rule well, thou must rule for God; and to do that thou must be ruled by Him who has given kings his grace to command themselves and their subject, and to the people the grace to obey God and their kings."

The trip was not one-sided in favour of Russia, however, as England likewise benefited from Peter's visit. Peter's father, Tsar Alexis, had severed diplomatic and commercial ties with England following the execution of King Charles I in 1649. The trade between the two countries declined precipitously and the Muscovy Company's monopoly on Anglo-Russian trade deteriorated in value. By the time of Peter's reign, many English merchants wished to gain access to the Russian markets thanks to the large quantities of various goods they could sell to the Russians. Additionally, English shipbuilders sought the importation of Russian raw materials (primarily oak) for the Royal Navy. The English were partially successful negotiating with Peter to establish stronger commercial ties. Noted academic Arthur MacGregor wrote as such concerning the impact of the trip:

For two decades following Peter's visit, British influence in Russia reached a peak. It manifested itself in social custom, in craft practice and in ships and naval organization. Through the influence of the Moscow School of Mathematics and Navigation it reached a significant sector of the population before relations cooled once again and the two nations pulled back from this era of unprecedented cordiality.

At first, Peter stayed at 21 Norfolk Street in London. On 9 February the tsar and his court moved into Sayes Court, which was adjacent to the Deptford Dockyard. They subleased the house from John Benbow, who was at the time renting the house from John Evelyn. John Evelyn did not meet with Peter. The Russian party did great harm to both house and grounds. Sir Christopher Wren, the royal surveyor, added up the bill. It totaled £305 9s 6d and included £3 for "wheelbarrows broke by the Czar". The damage was so extensive that:

No part of the house escaped damage. All the floors were covered with grease and ink, and three new floors had to be provided. The tiled stoves, locks to the doors, and all the paintwork had to be renewed. The curtains, quilts, and bed linen were 'tore in pieces.' All the chairs in the house, numbering over fifty, were broken, or had disappeared, probably used to stoke the fires. Three hundred window panes were broken and there were 'twenty fine pictures very much tore and all frames broke.' The garden which was Evelyn’s pride was ruined.

On his departure, Peter gave his mistress, Letitia Cross, £500 to thank her for her hospitality. Cross said it was not enough while Peter replied that he thought her overpaid.

On 21 April 1698 Peter left England for Holland. His yacht, the Royal Transport, accompanied him on part of the journey as it was set to sail to Russia without him. Although reports differ, Peter was able to garner between 60 and as high as 500 of British subjects that entered into the service of the Russian state. Many of the most notable were on the yacht that took them to Arkhangelsk.

== Return to Russia ==
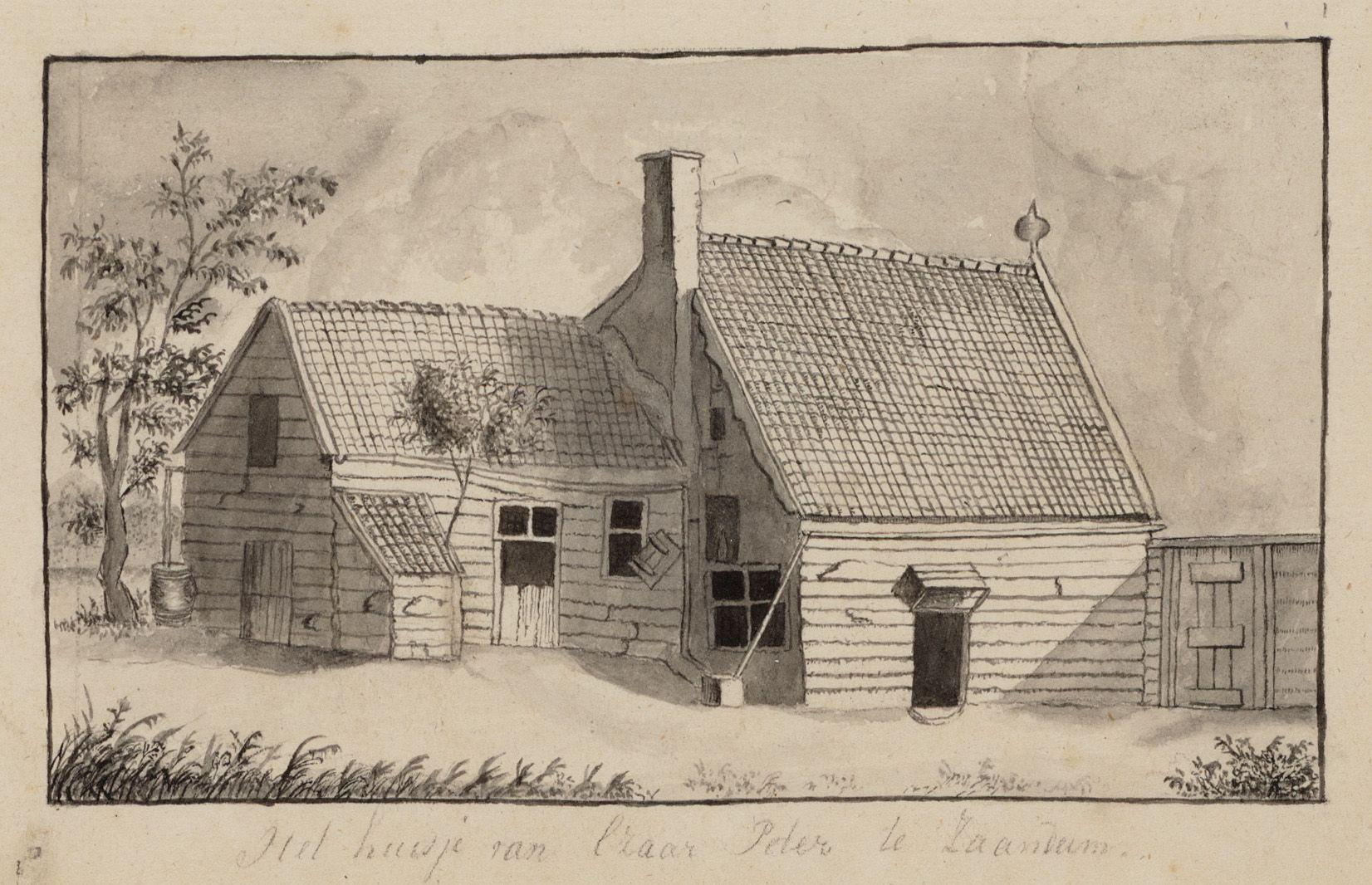
Exterior of Czar Peter House, Zaandam. Amsterdam City Archives.

On the way back to Russia, the Grand Embassy conducted fruitless negotiations in Vienna with Russia's former allies in the Holy League, the Austrian foreign minister and the Venetian ambassador, trying to prevent Austria's separate peace treaty with Turkey. An intended visit to Venice was canceled due to the news about the Streltsy Uprising in Moscow and Peter's hasty return to Russia.

The Grand Embassy failed to accomplish its main goal, but it gathered valuable information about the international situation, ascertained the impossibility of strengthening the anti-Turkish coalition due to the imminent War of the Spanish Succession, and brought back the plans for gaining access to the Baltic Sea. On his way back to Russia, Peter the Great met with Augustus II of Poland-Lithuania in Rava-Ruska and conducted negotiations with him, which would form the basis for the Russo-Polish alliance against Sweden in the Great Northern War.
