= De Wild =

De Wild may refer to:

- De Wild Family, a Dutch family of art professionals
- Ruud de Wild (born 1969), a Dutch radio host
- De Wild., taxonomic author abbreviation for Émile Auguste Joseph De Wildeman (1866–1947), Belgian botanist

== See also ==
- De Wilde, Dutch surname
- De Wildt, town and wildlife centre in South Africa named after Mauritz Edgar de Wildt
