= Dewilde =

Dewilde, DeWilde or deWilde is a surname. Notable people with the surname include:

- Brandon deWilde, American actor
- Dom DeWilde, an alias of Don Preston
- Marius Dewilde, French railway worker who claimed to have been contacted by extraterrestrial life-forms
- Fred Dewilde, French cartoonist and survivor of the Bataclan terrorist attack in Paris.

== See also ==
- Wilde
- De Wilde
