= Wylder (name) =

Wylder is a name, similar to Wilder and Wylde.

== People with the name Wylder ==
- Betty Wylder (1923–1994), American organist, folklorist, environmentalist
- James Wylder (born 1989), American writer
- Ruby Modine (born 1991), American actress, full name Ruby Wylder Rivera Modine

== Other uses ==
- Wylder, a place in France
- Debbie Wylder, a character in Two of a Kind (1983 film), played by Olivia Newton-John
- Eugene Wylder, a character in Max Reload and the Nether Blasters (2020), played by Greg Grunberg
- The Wylder, a character in Elden Ring: Nightreign (2025)

== See also ==
- Wilder (name)
- Wylde (surname)
