= Jaroslaw Drelich =

Jarek Drelich
- Born: August 28, 1957 (age 69); Kolbundy, Poland
- Education: Gdańsk University of Technology (BS); Gdańsk University of Technology (MS); University of Utah (PhD Metallurgical Engineering)
- Known for: Pioneering zinc alloys and their medical applications Surface science Science and application of wetting and contact angles Colloidal Interactions and adhesion and their practical implications
- Scientific career
- Fields: Applied surface chemistry Surface science Wetting phenomena Materials recycling
- Workplaces: Michigan Tech; University of Alberta

Jarosław Wiesław Drelich (born 1957), also known as Jarek Drelich, is a Polish-born surface and materials engineer and scientist, professor of materials science and engineering at Michigan Technological University.

== Early life and education ==
Drelich was born in Kolbudy, Poland, a small rural town about 15 km from Gdańsk. His parents are Maria (née Kwiatkowska) and Jan Drelich. Growing up in Kolbudy County, surrounded by forests, lakes, and streams, he developed a passion for outdoor activities such as fishing, mushroom hunting, camping, hiking, and scouting.

He attended elementary school in Kolbudy from 1964 to 1972 and became interested in the physical sciences. Graduating at the top of his class, Drelich passed the entrance exams to "Conradinum," a prestigious Ship and Technical School in Gdańsk. After graduating in 1977, he passed the entrance exams to Gdańsk University of Technology and started his BS and MS programs at the Chemistry Department.

It wasn't until his final year at university that he discovered his passion for scientific curiosity while working on the wettability and absorption of artificial and natural materials used in combating spilled oils on land and water. This scientific interest in understanding surface phenomena and drive for environmental innovations motivated Drelich to accept an engineering position at Gdańsk University of Technology, where he worked for six years before moving to the United States at the end of 1989 to start his PhD program. He successfully graduated with a PhD degree in Metallurgical Engineering from the University of Utah, Salt Lake City, in June 1993.

== Career ==
With an MS degree under his belt, Drelich embarked on a six-year journey at the Gdańsk University of Technology, where he honed his skills as a chemical engineer. His focus was on applied research, delving into areas such as oily-soil remediation, deoiling of aqueous waste, and oil spill clean-up. His expertise also extended to designing extraction units for analyzing oil concentration in water. During this time, he lent his knowledge as a consultant and engineer to private engineering firms in Gdańsk, primarily focusing on designing wastewater treatment plants and analyzing the quality of discharged waters from industrial operations. His collaborative efforts with the faculty and engineering staff at the Gdańsk University of Technology led to the development and production of novel coalescence filters, a breakthrough in cleaning small wastewater streams from dispersed oil. These filters found their way into factories and machine cleaning stations across Poland. Drelich's innovative spirit also led to the development of technologies for deoiling water streams from metal cleaning stations, factories, and shipyards.

After completing his PhD program in 1993, Drelich worked at the University of Utah for four years as a postdoctoral fellow and research assistant professor, focusing on surface chemistry applied to mineral processing, materials recycling and processing, oily soil remediation, and oil recovery.

In 1997, he joined Michigan Technological University (Michigan Tech) and worked as an assistant professor, associate professor, and professor. As of 2024, he holds the title of Distinguished Professor and teaches courses on characterization and processing of materials. Drelich advocates interdisciplinary capstone senior design projects and encourages students to consider technical, business, and social viability and interconnections in their work. He has edited seven books, published over 260 technical papers (Google Scholar Record ), holds ten patents, has given over 50 invited talks, including keynote addresses, and has delivered or co-authored over 100 conference presentations and posters.

Drelich was named the Editor-in-Chief of Surface Innovations in 2012 and served on the Editorial Advisory Board for various scientific and engineering journals. He is an active member of The Minerals, Metals, and Materials Society (TMS), Society for Mining, Metallurgy and Exploration (SME), and American Chemical Society (ACS). Drelich has served on several committees and organized and chaired several international symposia.

In 2021, Drelich established Huskies for America. The partnership involves Michigan Tech faculty, staff, students, alumni, and local residents. This initiative supports traditional values, critical thinking, and conservative student organizations on the Michigan Tech campus, including Young Americans for Freedom and Turning Point USA. The partnership's mission is to educate and promote liberty, freedom, and constitutional and religious rights on campus, in the Upper Peninsula, and in students' future communities. Drelich also assisted in fundraising efforts, which enabled students to host nationally recognized speakers like Scott Atlas, Riley Gaines, Yeonmi Park, and many others.

== Research ==
In his early research, Drelich used his expertise in oily-soil remediation, deoiling of aqueous waste, oil spill clean-up, and designing extraction units to analyze oil concentration in water. His scientific contributions included studies on modeling the absorptivity of porous structures used in spilled oil clean-up. This research has driven his scientific interest in understanding liquid-solid interactions and resulting contact angles, which he pursued at the University of Utah and later at Michigan Tech.

During his time at the University of Utah, Drelich focused on fundamental and advanced concepts of surface chemistry, which he applied to mineral processing, materials recycling and processing, oily soil remediation, and oil recovery. He incorporated line tension effects into the Cassie and Wenzel equations, among several contributions to the surface chemistry sub-discipline. These classical surface chemistry equations describe equilibrium contact angles on solids with heterogeneous and rough surfaces, respectively.

At Michigan Tech, Drelich continued to apply surface chemistry and interfacial engineering for materials processing, fabrication, and recycling. His research activities included fundamentals of wetting, spreading, and adhesion phenomena, adhesion force measurements for colloidal particles using atomic force microscopy, modification of inorganic surfaces with organic monolayers, and fabrication of microscopic and sub-microscopic structures using unconventional patterning techniques. He strongly contributed to the adhesion and colloid science of fine particles.

Drelich's research furthered the understanding of interactions between rough surfaces and led to the development of a new design of polymeric coatings in pharmaceutical systems. He also utilized atomic force microscopy to map surface charges on solids in electrolyte solutions and gain crucial information on surface charges and their distribution at a resolution of several nanometers.

Since the early 2000s, Drelich has explored the biomedical field by designing and inventing new implant materials made of metals and ceramics, with surfaces featuring improved biological integration and biocompatibility. He pioneered zinc alloys as biodegradable candidates for interventional vascular stenting applications and conducted extensive in vivo studies with a small animal model and biomedical engineering and clinical collaborators. His research has contributed to a better understanding of the biocorrosion of metals and the structure of biointerphases.

== Professional service ==
Professionally, Drelich is active in both The Minerals, Metals & Materials Society and the Society for Mining, Metallurgy, and Exploration. He has chaired, co-chaired, and developed many symposia for these organizations' meetings in addition to providing service to many of the technical divisions and committees..

== Awards and honors ==
- Elected TMS Fellow – Class of 2024
- Appointed as a Richard Witte Endowed Professor, Michigan Tech (2023)
- Reappointment as a Distinguished Professor, Michigan Tech (2023)
- Nominated and elected Senator At-Large, Michigan Tech (2023)
- The World’s Top 2% Scientist, Stanford University/Elsevier/Mendeley, 2020 – 2024
- Awarded with the title of Distinguished Professor, Michigan Tech (2018)
- Honorable Panelist Speaker, Int. Symp. Biodegradable Metals, Montreal, Canada (2016)

Named Editor-in-Chief, ICE Publishing journal: Surface Innovations (2012)

- Food Safety Innovation Award from GLEQ (Great Lakes Entrepreneur’s Quest), Michigan (2012)
- Individual Awards (1984, 1986, 1987) and I-Degree Group Award for Research (1988), Gdansk University of Technology, Poland

== Impactful publications ==
1. J. Drelich, J.D. Miller, and R.J. Good; The effect of drop (bubble) size on advancing and receding contact angles for heterogeneous and rough solid surfaces as observed with sessile-drop and captive-bubble techniques, Journal of Colloid and Interface Science 179, 1996, 37-50.
2. J. Drelich, J.L. Wilbur, J.D. Miller, and G.M. Whitesides; Contact angles for liquid drops at a model heterogeneous surface consisting of alternating and parallel hydrophobic/hydrophilic strips, Langmuir 12, 1996, 1913-1922.
3. E.R. Beach, G.W. Tormoen, J. Drelich, and R. Han; Pull-off force measurements between rough surfaces by atomic force microscopy, Journal of Colloid and Interface Science 247(1), 2002, 84-99.
4. X. Yin and J. Drelich, Surface charge microscopy: novel technique for mapping charge-mosaic surfaces in electrolyte solutions; Langmuir 24(15), 2008, 8013-8020.
5. J. Drelich and Y.U. Wang; Charge heterogeneity of surfaces: mapping and effects on surface forces. Advances in Colloid and Interface Science 165, 2011, 91-101.
6. Ch.H. Lee, N. Johnson, J. Drelich, and Y.K. Yap; The performance of superhydrophobic and superoleophilic carbon nanotube meshes in water-oil filtration, Carbon 49(2), 2011, 669-676.
7. J. Drelich, E. Chibowski, D.D. Meng, and K. Terpilowski; Hydrophilic and superhydrophilic surfaces and materials, Soft Matter 7(21), 2011, 9804-9828.
8. P.K. Bowen, J. Drelich, and J. Goldman; Zinc exhibits ideal physiological corrosion behavior for bioabsorbable stents, Advanced Materials 25(18), 2013, 2577-2582.
9. J. Drelich, Guidelines to measurements of reproducible contact angles using a sessile-drop technique; Surface Innovations 1(4), 2013, 248-254.
10. P.K. Bowen, E.R. Shearier, S. Zhao, R.J. Guillory II, F. Zhao, J. Goldman, and J.W. Drelich; Biodegradable metals for cardiovascular stents: from clinical concerns to recent Zn - alloys, Advanced Healthcare Materials 5(10), 2016, 1121-1140.
11. A. Marmur, C.Della Volpe, S. Siboni, A. Amirfazli, and J.W. Drelich; Contact angles and wettability: towards common and accurate terminology, Surface Innovations 5(1)(2017)3-8.
12. A.J. Drelich, R.J. Guillory II, J.W. Drelich, and J. Goldman; Long-term surveillance of zinc implant in murine artery: surprisingly steady biocorrosion rate, Acta Biomaterialia 58(2017)539-49.
13. E. Mostaed, M. Sikora-Jasinska, J.W. Drelich, and M. Vedani; Zinc alloys for degradable vascular stent applications, Acta Biomaterialia 71(2018)1-23.
14. J.W. Drelich, L. Boinovich, E. Chibowski, C. Della Volpe, L. Holysz, A. Marmur, and S. Siboni; Contact angles: history of over 200 years of open questions, Surface Innovations 8(1-2)(2020)3-27.
15. E. Mostaed, M.S. Ardakani, M. Sikora-Jasinska, A. Mostaed, I.M. Reaney, J. Goldman, and J.W. Drelich; Towards revealing key factors in mechanical instability of bioabsorbable Zn-based alloys for vascular stenting, Acta Biomaterialia 105(2020)319-335.
16. J. Drelich, J.S. Laskowski and K.L. Mittal (Eds); Apparent and Microscopic Contact Angles, VSP, AH Zeist, Netherlands, 2000, pp. 522.
17. J. Drelich and K.L. Mittal (Eds); Atomic Force Microscopy in Adhesion Studies, VSP, Utrecht-Boston 2005, pp.811.
18. J. Drelich, J.-Y. Hwang, J. Adams, D.R. Nagaraj, X. Sun, and Z, Xu (Eds); Water in Mineral Processing, Society for Mining, Metallurgy, and Exploration, Inc. (SME), Littleton, Colorado 2012, pp. 407.
