= Statue of Peter the Great, Deptford =

2000 statue by Mihail Chemiakin

Coordinates: 51.483369°N 0.019062°W

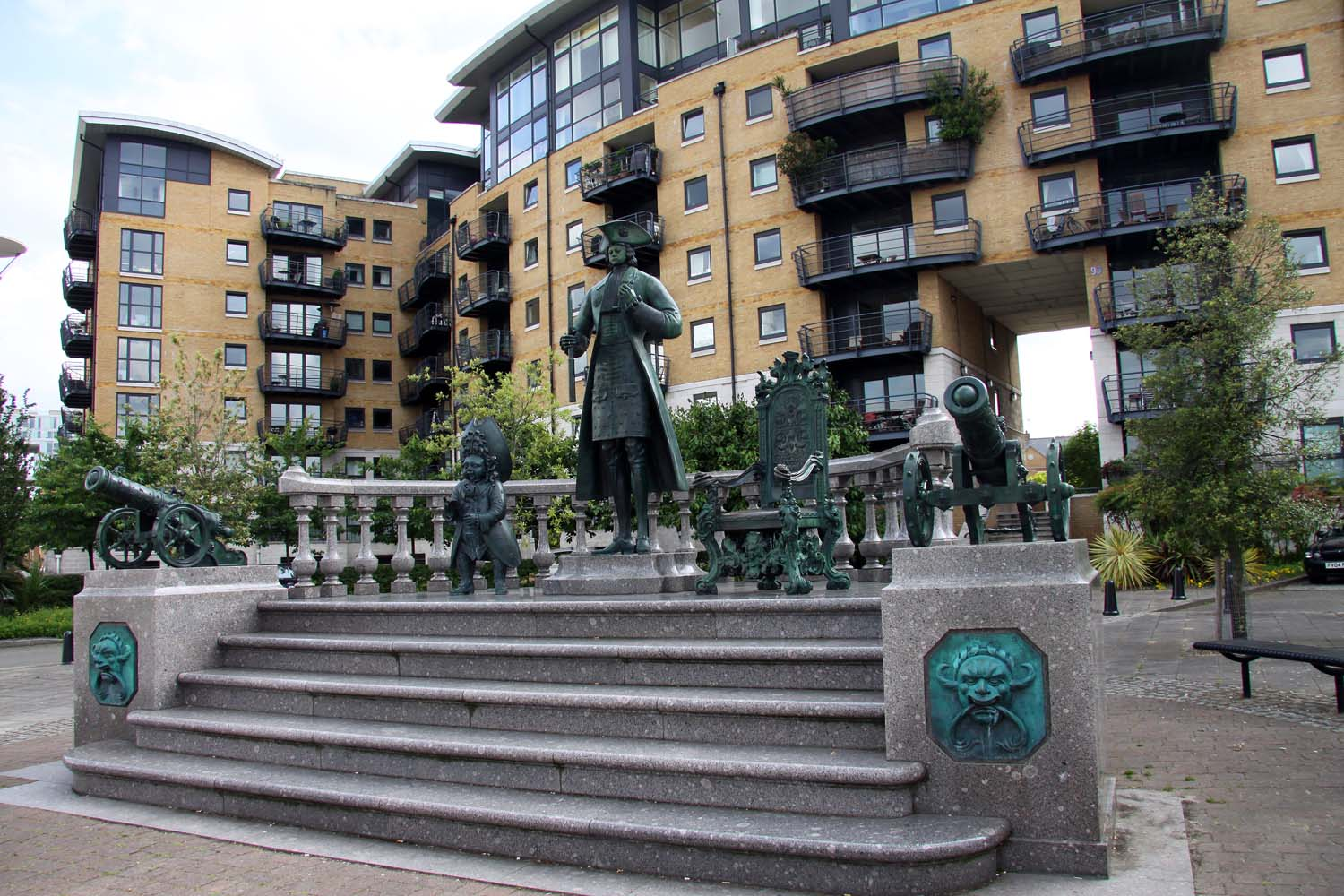
The memorial in 2012

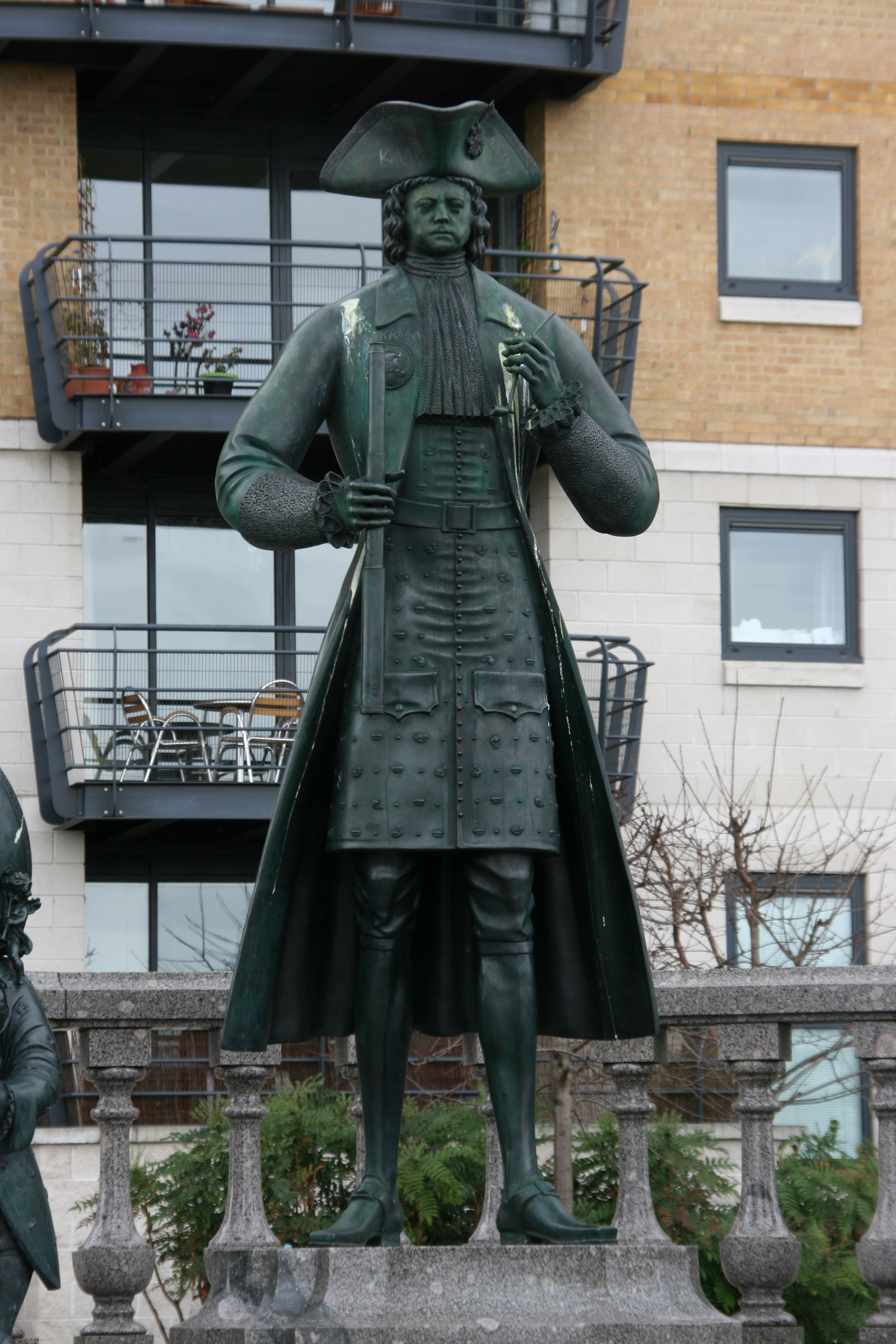
Central statue of Peter the Great in 2008

A memorial to the Russian Tsar Peter the Great was erected in London in 2000 to commemorate the tercentenary of the Grand Embassy of Peter the Great. It stands on Glaisher Street, in a corner of Deptford within the Royal Borough of Greenwich, beside the confluence of the River Thames and Deptford Creek.

== Background ==
Peter the Great travelled to western Europe on a diplomatic mission from March 1697 to August 1698. After visiting Frederick I in Prussia, and William III in the Netherlands, Peter arrived in England in January 1698 with a large entourage that included four dwarfs. He met members of William III's court in England, and visited the Royal Observatory at Greenwich, the Royal Mint at the Tower of London, the Royal Society at Gresham College, the University of Oxford, and various shipyards and munitions factories, including Deptford Dockyard and Woolwich Arsenal.

Peter resided for most of his visit at Sayes Court, adjacent to Deptford Dockyard. The house was owned by John Evelyn but leased to the naval officer John Benbow, who sublet to Peter. During his brief period of residence, Peter and his entourage caused hundreds of pounds of damage to all parts of the house and its grounds: damaging the floors, walls and doors; breaking furniture and windows; and destroying soft furnishings, bed linen and the garden.

Peter left England in April 1698, starting his journey home via the Netherlands to Vienna. A proposed visit to Venice was abandoned and the mission curtailed by the outbreak of the Streltsy uprising in Moscow.

== Memorial ==
The memorial stands on a path beside the south bank of the River Thames, surrounded by the Millennium Quay housing development. It comprises several bronze sculptures by the Russian artist Mihail Chemiakin, erected on a broad marble platform designed by the Russian architect Vyacheslav Bukhayev. Chemiakin's bronze Monument to Peter I had been erected at the Peter and Paul Fortress in Saint Petersburg in 1991.

The stone platform rises on five steps, with a stone balustrade behind. The rear of the platform is decorated with depictions of food and drink. Mounted on the platform are three bronze sculptures. A tall statue of Peter the Great stands on a shallow stone plinth at the centre, looking out over the river; he is depicted in 17th century dress including a long coat and tricorn hat, holding a pipe and a telescope, but with a peculiarly small head. To his left is an ornate bronze throne, and to his right a bronze statue of a court dwarf.

Bronze cannons stand on stone plinths at either end of the platform bear, with bronze grotesque plaques to the front. The side of the left plinth bears a descriptive inscription in English: "Peter the Great - Russian Czar, Peter the Great, arrived in England in January 1698 and stayed in Sir John Evelyn's house, Sayes Court in Deptford for four months. This monument is erected near the royal shipyard where Peter the Great studied the English science of shipbuilding. The monument is a gift from the Russian people and commemorates the visit of Peter the Great to this country in search of knowledge and experience".

The rear of the left plinth records the names of the sculptor Mihail Chemiakin and the architect Vyacheslav Bukhayev.

The side and rear of the right plinth bear similar inscriptions in Russian.

== Reception ==
The memorial was unveiled in 2001 by the Russian ambassador Grigory Karasin and Prince Michael of Kent, as royal patron of the Peter the Great Tercentenary Committee. Vladimir Putin visited the memorial with Prince Andrew, Duke of York in June 2003, during the Russian president's four-day state visit to London.

The memorial was damaged in April 2022 by metal thieves, using an angle grinder in an attempt to steal some of the metal elements.
