= Lâm Quang Mỹ =

Polish-Vietnamese poet (1944–2023)

Nguyễn Đình Dũng
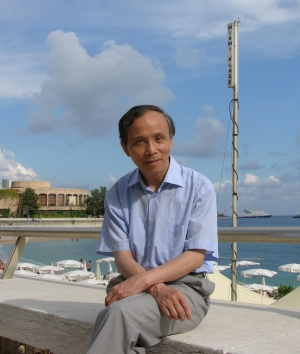
- Lâm Quang Mỹ
- Born: Nguyễn Đình Dũng; 1944; Nghi Lộc, Nghệ An, Japanese-occupied French Indochina
- Died: 26 July 2023 (aged 79); Warsaw, Poland
- Occupations: Poet, Doctor of Physics
- Writing career
- Pen name: Lâm Quang Mỹ
- Language: Vietnamese, Polish
- Notable works: Echo (2004); Đoi (2004)
- Notable awards: UNESCO World Poetry Day 2006

Lâm Quang Mỹ (1944 – 26 July 2023) was a Polish-Vietnamese poet. He studied electronics at Gdańsk University of Technology. before returning to work for the Science and Technology Research Center in Hanoi. He returned to Poland in 1989 where he completed a PhD in physics from the Physics Institute of the Polish Academy of Sciences.

Lâm composed poetry and translated literature of both languages. He was an active participant in Polish literary life, taking part in events including the Warsaw Poetic Autumn, UNESCO World Poetry Days, International Poetic November in Poznań, Poetic Autumn in Krynica, International Literary Autumn at Pogórze, and international events such as "And the City spoke" in the UK, Poland and Italy, the International Festival of Poetry in Vilnius (Lithuania) and the International Festival "Poets Without Frontiers" in Polanica.

Lâm was an honorary citizen of Krasne, region of Zygmunt Krasiński, Poland and was a laureate of several awards including UNESCO World Poetry Days 2006 and 2016. He was a member of the Vietnamese Writers Association (Hội Nhà văn Việt Nam), the Polish Writers' Union and was an active jury member of the Polish Chapter of Young Poets (under 40 years).

Lâm Quang Mỹ died on 26 July 2023, at the age of 79.

== Literary works published ==
- Tieng vong Echo (poetry, bilingual, in Vietnamese and Polish, Oficyjna Publishing House, Warsaw 2004).
- Đoi Waiting (poetry, in Vietnamese, Culture and Information Publishing House, Hà Nội 2004).
- Zatoulana piseń A Wanderer's Song (poetry, in Czech, translated by Věra Kopecká, Broumov publishing House, 2008).
- Chieu roi tren song Evening descends on waves (poetry, bilingual, in Vietnamese and English, translated by Thieu Khanh, Andrew and Anita Fincham, Writers Association Publishing House, Hanoi 2010)
- An Anthology of Vietnamese poems from the 11th Century to the 19th Century (in Polish, translated by Lam Quang My and Pavel Kubiak, IBIS Publishing House, Poland 2010).
- Przemija życie ... Life passes on ... (poetry, printed bilingual, in Polish and English, Temat Publishing House, Poland 2013).
- An Anthology of Vietnamese Poems from 1932 to 1941 (in Polish, translated by Lam Quang My and Pavel Kubiak, Temat Publishing House, Poland 2015).
- Tháng Ngày Et la vie s'en va (poetry, bilingual, in Vietnamese and French, translated by Athanase Vantchev de Thracy, Institut Cultural Solenzara Publishing House, Paris 2016)
- Fourth Dimension (poetry, in English, translated by poets Anita Fincham, Andrew Fincham and Thieu Khanh, Xlibris American Publishing House, 2017).

== Awards received ==
- Prize for the arresting poems on Autumn, by the Polish Writers’ Association, 2004.
- Two Prizes for Poetry and Literary Activities in 2006 and 2016 on the International Poetry Days by Polish UNESCO.
- Two 1st Prizes (conferred by the Examination Boards and by the public) from "The Poetry Marathon Contest" at The Fifth Poetry Festival among the countries having a common border with Poland" in the city of Rzeszow, 2008.
- Two "Large Laurels Branches" for poetry and poetry translation at the International Festival of Literature in Galicja, Poland, in 2009 and 2011.
- Commemorative Plaque of "For the cause of Vietnamese Literature and Arts" by Vietnam Union of Literature and Arts Associations, 2010.
- Clement Janicki prize named for Lifetime Achievement and the contribution to the European Cultures, 2013.
- The ministerial Medal for Contribution to Polish Culture, 2013.
- The Medal Expectance (SPES) from the Poland Foundation for Socio - Cultural Development, 2016.
