= De Wilde =

De Wilde or de Wilde is a Dutch surname, meaning "the wild one". Abroad the name can be agglutinated like DeWilde, Dewilde or deWilde. Some notable people who have this surname are:

- August De Wilde (1819–1886), Belgian painter
- Autumn de Wilde (b. 1970), American photographer
- Bernard de Wilde (1691–1772), Belgian architect
- Brandon deWilde (1942–1972), American theatre and film actor
- Christiaan De Wilde, Belgian business executive
- Dingenis de Wilde (1885–1947), Dutch sports shooter
- Edy de Wilde (1919–2005), Dutch museum curator
- Dom DeWilde, an alias of Don Preston (born 1932), American jazz and rock keyboardist
- Etienne De Wilde (b. 1958), Belgian road bicycle racer
- Filip De Wilde (b. 1964), Belgian football goalkeeper
- Jaap de Wilde (b. 1957), Dutch international relations scholar
- Jacob de Wilde (1645–1721), Dutch numismatist
- Jacob Adriaan de Wilde (1879–1956), Dutch politician
- Julien De Wilde (b. 1944), Belgian business executive
- Katherine August-deWilde, American business executive
- Laurent de Wilde (b. 1960), French jazz musician
- Lisa de Wilde (b. 1956), Canadian film and television executive
- Maria de Wilde (1682–1729), Dutch engraver and playwright
- Marius Dewilde (1921–1996), French railway worker who claimed to have been contacted by extraterrestrials
- Robert de Wilde (b. 1977), Dutch motocross racer
- Samuel De Wilde (1751–1832), English portrait painter
- Sebastiaan De Wilde (b. 1993), Belgian footballer
- Sjef De Wilde (b. 1983), Belgian racing cyclist
- Rick DeWilde (b.1976), Alaskan outdoorsman on TV show Life Below Zero.

== See also ==
- De Wild, Dutch surname
- De Wildt, town and wildlife centre in South Africa named after Mauritz Edgar de Wildt
- Wilde, English surname
