= Jacob de Wilde =

Dutch collector

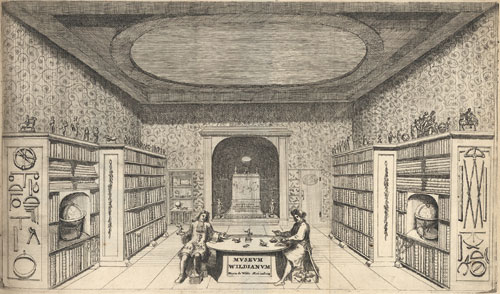
Jacob de Wilde (left) and Peter the Great on 13 December 1697, engraving by Maria de Wilde

Jacob de Wilde (1645–1721) was a citizen of the Dutch Republic. Of modest stock, he married well and rose socially to become ontvanger-generaal (or collector-general, responsible for collecting taxes) of the Admiralty of Amsterdam. He is better known, however, as a collector of coins, medals, antique statues, and scientific instruments, whose collection was housed in a museum built behind the property he owned in Amsterdam; the Museum Wildeanum drew many important international visitors.

== Biography ==
Much of the biographical data were established indirectly by I. H. van Eeghen, and published in a 1958 article on which the following relies. According to himself he was born on the 14 December 1645 in The Hague to Remonstrant parents, but baptismal records were not preserved. His father, Willem de Wilde, and grandfather were plumbers; his mother, Hillegont Herpers of Gouda, came from a well-known Remonstrant family and it is likely that he got the position of collector-general for the Admiralty of Amsterdam through his mother's second husband, who occupied various civil positions in Amsterdam.

In January 1677 De Wilde married Hendrina Veen, a granddaughter of Jacobus Arminius. The Veens were allied to two families who had great power within the Admiralty, which served the newly married couple well. They were married in Sloterdijk. The couple had five daughters and three sons, all baptized in the Remonstrant church on Keizersgracht. The daughters married well, into the middle classes, one of them with the philologist Tiberius Hemsterhuis. Hendrina Veen died in 1710 and was buried in the Oude Kerk. Jacob was buried there on 15 March 1721. In 1720 his son Willem was appointed by the States-General on a diplomatic post in St Petersburg.

== De Wilde's collection ==
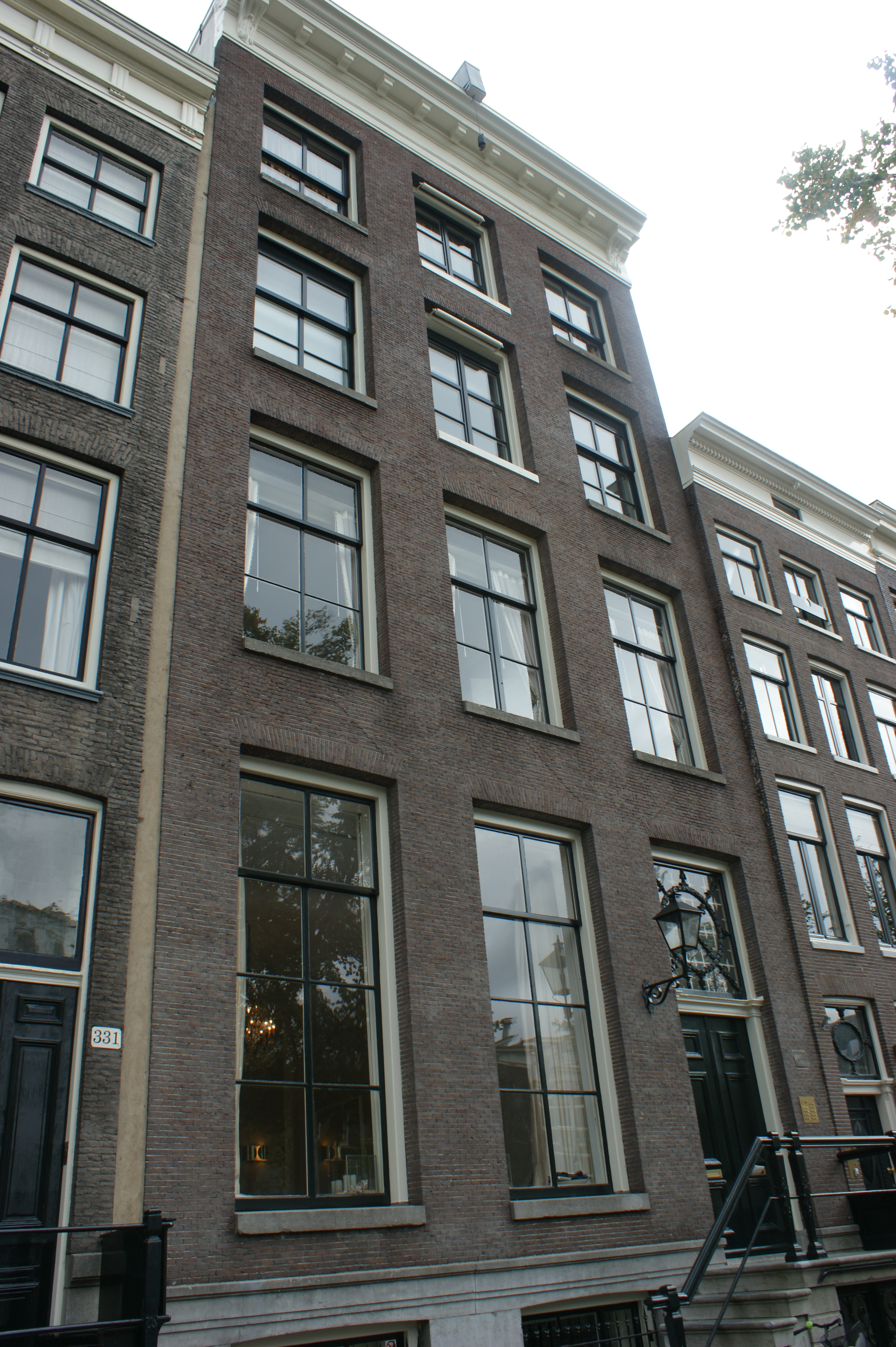
Keizersgracht 333

De Wilde's collection was housed in the Museum Wildeanum, built behind the family home on Keizersgracht 333 which he rented from 1682 and then bought in 1708, and extending behind the adjacent properties on 335 and 337. (Note: Reve and other sources place him on the Herengracht; van Eeghen's 1958 article, which places him on the Keizersgracht, includes evidence from the Amsterdam City Archives.) The collection included coins, medals, statuettes (many of "pagan" symbols, including a bust of Isis and a pair of statues of Venus and Mars), and scientific instruments. Two catalogs exist, both with engravings by his daughter Maria de Wilde: Signa antiqua e museo Jacobi de Wilde (statuettes, 1700) and Gemma selecta antiqua e museo Jacobi de Wilde (coins and gems, 1703) but not all items were as antique as was claimed in the catalog: according to Joaneath Spicer, at least one of the statuettes, a candlestick modeled on the Candlestick in the shape of a Hercules by Peter Vischer the Younger (now in the Walters Art Museum), was in fact not Roman but rather of much more recent, Northern European origin. Spicer estimates that "over twenty percent [of the collection depicted in the 1700 catalog] can be identified as Renaissance designs, largely from Padua".

His collection drew the interest of the Russian tsar Peter the Great, who visited de Wilde's home on 13 December 1697 (the eve of de Wilde's birthday) during his "Grand Embassy" of Western Europe. (Note: The pages containing Peter's signature in his guestbook were thought missing, but turned out to be in the library of the Imperial Academy of Arts in Saint Petersburg. They are now in the Amsterdam City Archives.) De Wilde's daughter Maria made an engraving of the meeting between Peter and her father, providing visual evidence of "the beginning of the West European classical tradition in Russia", which she presented to Peter on his second visit, on the same date in 1717. In the engraving, two men sit facing each other across a table surrounded by book cases and scientific instruments (de Wilde was proud of his interest in and experience with astronomy); the tsar, on the right, can be identified by the double-headed eagle at his feet, an element of the coat of arms of Russia. In back is a "cabinet/altar". Scotsman Robert Erskine (1677–1718), chief physician and adviser to Peter the Great, studied de Wilde's collection (and many others) in the planning and design of the tsar's Kunstkamera. The Alsatian Johann Daniel Schumacher, Erskine's secretary and court librarian in Saint Petersburg, visited the collection in 1721, reportedly a few months after de Wilde's death.

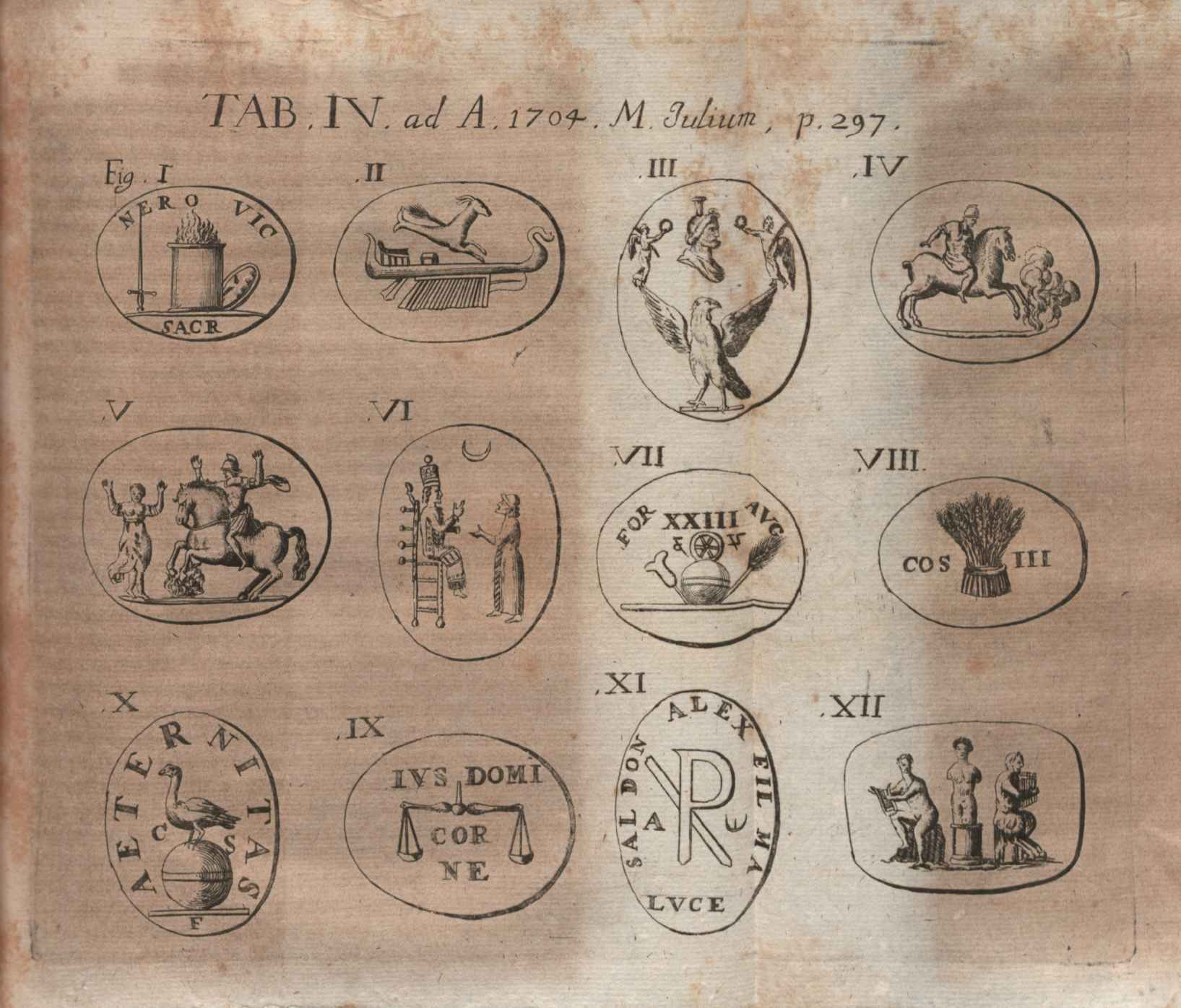
Illustration from critique of Gemmae antiquae selectae ... published in Acta Eruditorum, 1704

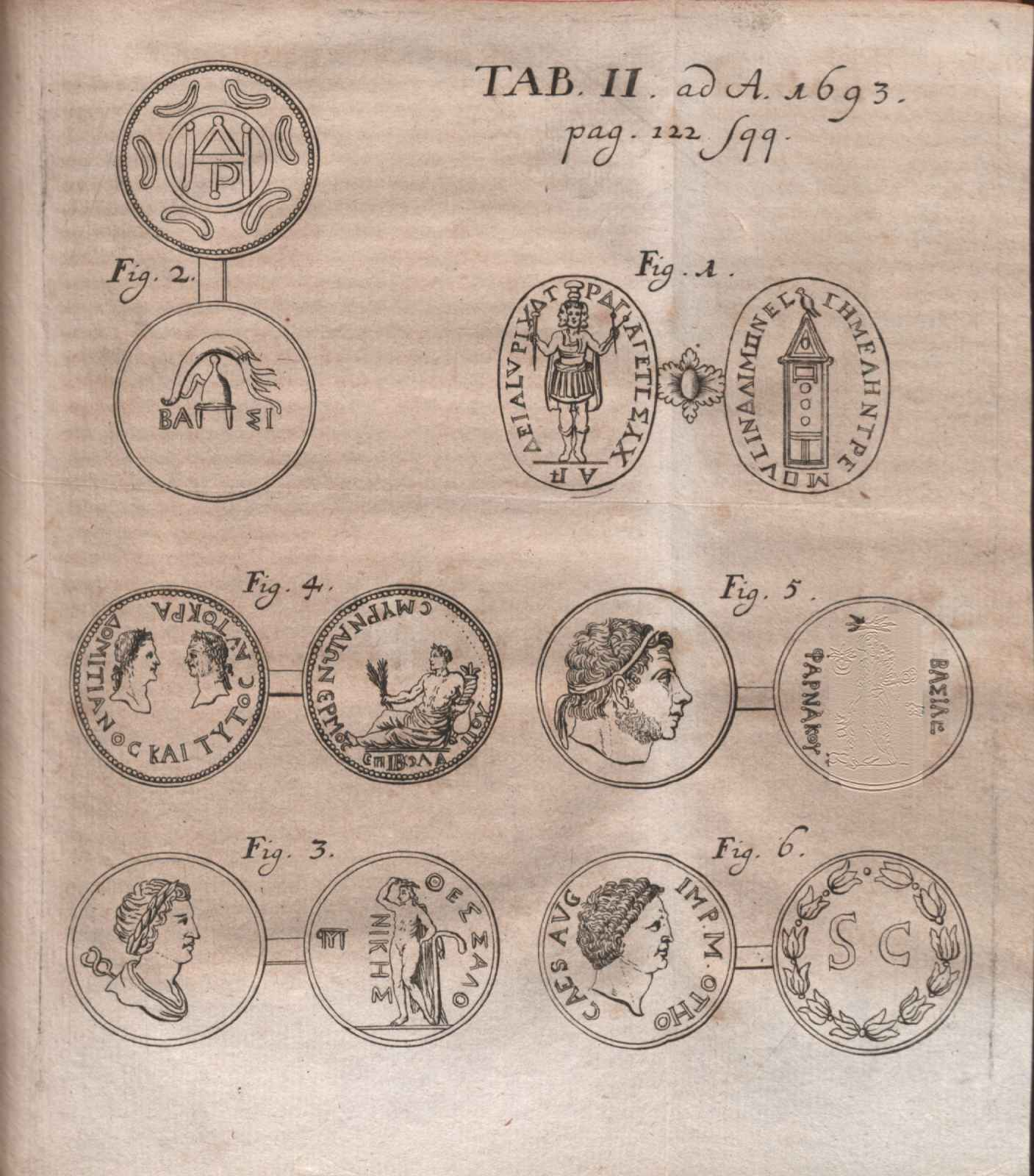
Illustration from critique of Selecta numismata antiqua; ex musæo Jacobi de Wilde published in Acta Eruditorum, 1693

After de Wilde's death, the collection most likely was dispersed. According to Roger Tavernier, Peter the Great acquired it. His set of gems were next in the possession of William IV, Prince of Orange; the collection later came into the care of the Royal Coin Cabinet in Leiden, and was catalogued by Marianne Maaskant-Kleibrink in 1978 (the Cabinet later merged with the Geldmuseum in Utrecht).
