= Gdańsk University of Technology =

University in Gdańsk, Poland

Coordinates: 54°22′17″N 18°37′8″E

Gdańsk University of Technology, Gdańsk Tech
- Politechnika Gdańska
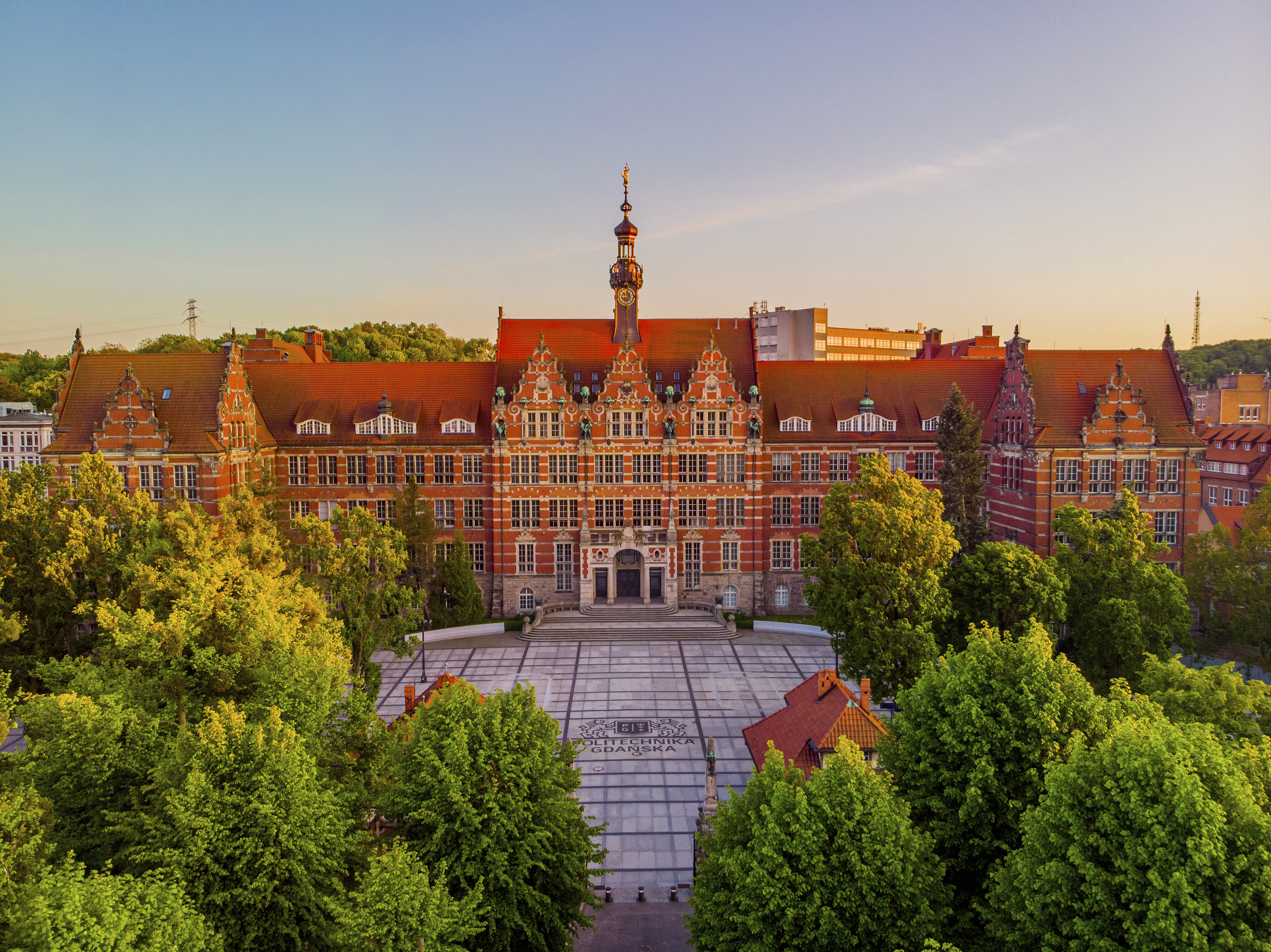
- Latin: Polytechnica Gedanensis
- Motto: "Historia mądrością – przyszłość wyzwaniem"
- Motto in English: "History is wisdom – the future is a challenge"
- Type: Public
- Established: 6 October 1904; 121 years ago; 24 May 1945; 81 years ago (re-established)
- Accreditation: EUA-IEP (European University Association-Institutional Evaluation Programme)
- Affiliations: CESAER, Erasmus+, EUA
- Rector: Krzysztof Wilde
- Students: 15,643 (2024)
- Undergraduates: 11,766 (2024)
- Postgraduates: 3,458 (2024)
- Doctoral students: 419 (2024)
- Location: Narutowicza 11/12; 80–233 Gdańsk Wrzeszcz, Gdańsk, Pomeranian Voivodeship, Poland
- Campus: 80 hectares (200 acres)
- Website: www.pg.edu.pl

University rankings

Global – Overall
- ARWU World: ▼ N/A (2026)
- QS World: ▲801-850 (2026)
- THE World: 1001-1200 (2026)
- USNWR Global: ▲949 (2026)

Regional – Overall
- QS Emerging Europe and Central Asia: ▲78 (2022)
- QS Europe: ▲283 (2026)
- THE Europe: ▲392 (2026)
- USNWR Europe: ▲327 (2026)

National – Overall
- ARWU National: ▼ N/A (2026)
- QS National: ▼6 (2026)
- THE National: ▲4 (2026)
- USNWR National: 6 (2026)

The Gdańsk University of Technology (Gdańsk Tech; Polish: Politechnika Gdańska) is a public research university in Gdańsk, Poland. Founded in 1904 and re-established in 1945, it is the oldest university of technology in modern-day Poland. Gdańsk Tech is consistently ranked among the leading universities in the country.

The university has eight academic faculties offering programmes in 40 fields of study across 14 scientific disciplines. Its campus is in the Wrzeszcz district of Gdańsk and covers 80 hectares (200 acres). In 2023, the university had 15,643 students, including 11,766 undergraduate students, 3,458 postgraduate students and 419 doctoral students.

Gdańsk University of Technology has institutional accreditation under the European University Association's Institutional Evaluation Programme (EUA-IEP).

== History ==
=== Foundation and German Empire (1899–1918) ===
On 16 March 1899, following a decision by Wilhelm II, deputies of the Kingdom of Prussia approved the establishment of a technical university in Gdańsk, then part of the German Empire. Albert Carsten was appointed chief designer of the university. Construction began in 1900 and was completed four years later. The buildings were designed in the Northern Renaissance style with Art Nouveau elements.

The university was formally opened on 6 October 1904 as the Royal Institute of Technology in Gdańsk (German: Königliche Technische Hochschule zu Danzig). It enrolled 189 students in its first year. By 1914, the number of regular students had increased to 675. The university remained open during World War I.

=== Free City of Danzig (1918–1933) ===
After World War I, Gdańsk became part of the Free City of Danzig and in 1918 the university was renamed the Technical University of the Free City of Danzig (German: Technische Hochschule der Freien Stadt Danzig). Under an agreement with the Second Polish Republic, the Free City authorities introduced a Polish-language course and lectures on Polish economic geography. Polish students were provided with the necessary textbooks and teaching materials. Foreign students, with the exception of Poles, were required to present a passport.

Student numbers increased during the period. The university had 1,651 students in the winter semester of 1922, 1,630 in 1929 and 1,548 in 1933. German students formed the majority, while Polish students constituted a significant minority. The student body also included Ukrainians, Russians, Bulgarians, Yugoslavs, Estonians and Jews.

=== German Nazi takeover (1933–1939) ===
The Nazis' seizure of power in the Free City of Danzig in 1933 led to the forced retirement of older professors and the dismissal or suspension of Jewish students. Most student organisations were dissolved and replaced by the compulsory National Socialist German Students' League. In 1934, Ernst Pohlhausen, a member of the NSDAP, became rector. By 1939, Pohlhausen had dismissed all Polish and Jewish students and staff.

=== World War II (1939–1945) ===
At the outbreak of World War II, Gdańsk was annexed by Nazi Germany. In 1941, the university was placed under the control of the Berlin authorities and additional regulations were introduced. The number of students and staff declined during the war. In 1944, the university was converted into a hospital with 3,000 beds. Much of its equipment and documentation was evacuated to Germany.

=== Re-establishment and People's Republic of Poland (1945–1989) ===
In January 1945, after Gdańsk came under Polish administration, preparations began to re-establish the university as a Polish institution. A decree of 24 May 1945 established the university as a Polish state academic institution. The first members of its post-war staff came mainly from universities in Lviv and Warsaw. Teaching began on 22 October 1945 and the official inauguration took place on 9 April 1946. The re-establishment was supervised by Stanisław Turski, a Polish mathematician and former prisoner of German Nazi concentration camps.

During the 1960s and 1970s, the university expanded its facilities and increased its student population. By the late 1980s, it had several faculties and several thousand students.

=== Republic of Poland (1989–now) ===
The political changes of 1989 brought changes to the organisation and administration of higher education in Poland. Employees, students and graduates of Gdańsk University of Technology were involved in political and social activity during this period. Among them was Andrzej Gwiazda.

Between 1990 and 2010, the university underwent organisational and infrastructural changes. New laboratories and other facilities were constructed, including facilities associated with the Nanotechnology Centre and the Pomerania Centre of Advanced Technologies. Degree programmes were reorganised into three cycles leading to bachelor's, master's and doctoral degrees. The university also introduced the European Credit Transfer and Accumulation System (ECTS) and a quality assurance system.

== Location ==
The Gdańsk University of Technology (Gdańsk Tech) is located in Gdańsk, situated at the mouth of the Vistula River on the Baltic Sea. The Main Campus is situated in the centre of old Wrzeszcz. The campus is located on Narutowicza Street.

== Interior ==
The main building, designed by Hermann Eggertt and Albert Carsten, was built between 1900 and 1904. All the buildings were designed in the style of the Northern Renaissance with elements of Art Nouveau. The images above the eastern side gate are a lighthouse and the tower of St. Mary's Church. The ornamental gutters are decorated with copper spouts in the shape of four male figures holding water monsters. The Clock Tower destroyed in 1945 was restored to the roof of the main building on 13 May 2012. The tower is 18 metres in height. The main building encloses inner courtyards that were covered by glass domes.

In 2012, the South Courtyard was officially renamed in honour of Johannes Hevelius. It is named after the French physicist who first performed a similar experiment at the Paris Pantheon in 1851. The Foucault pendulum is designed to show the rotation of the Earth on its axis. An electromagnet fixed at the point of suspension powers the movement of the pendulum. Reliefs in the window niches above the Foucault pendulum show the design of a reflective sundial (on the left) and a rotating map of the sky with a sextant.

== Faculties ==
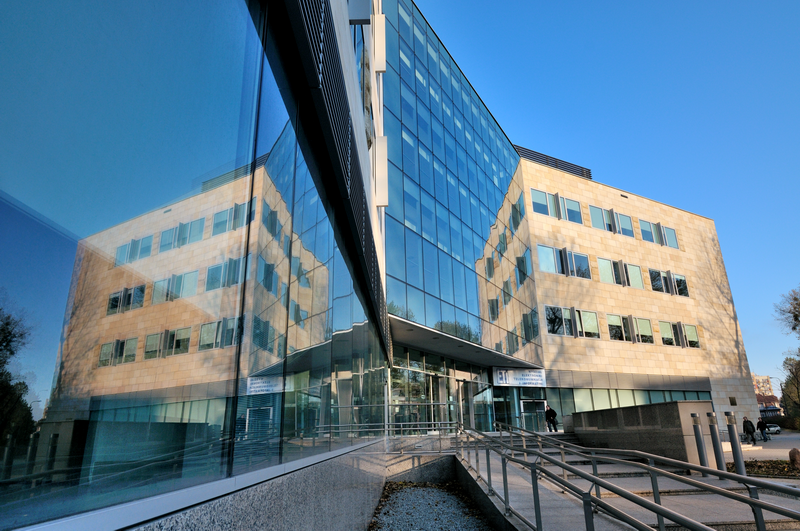
Faculty of Electronics, Telecommunications and Informatics

The university's faculties are:

- Faculty of Architecture
- Faculty of Electronics, Telecommunications and Informatics
- Faculty of Electrical and Control Engineering
- Faculty of Applied Physics and Mathematics
- Faculty of Civil and Environmental Engineering
- Faculty of Mechanical Engineering
- Faculty of Ocean Engineering and Ship Technology
- Faculty of Management and Economics

=== Chemical Faculty ===
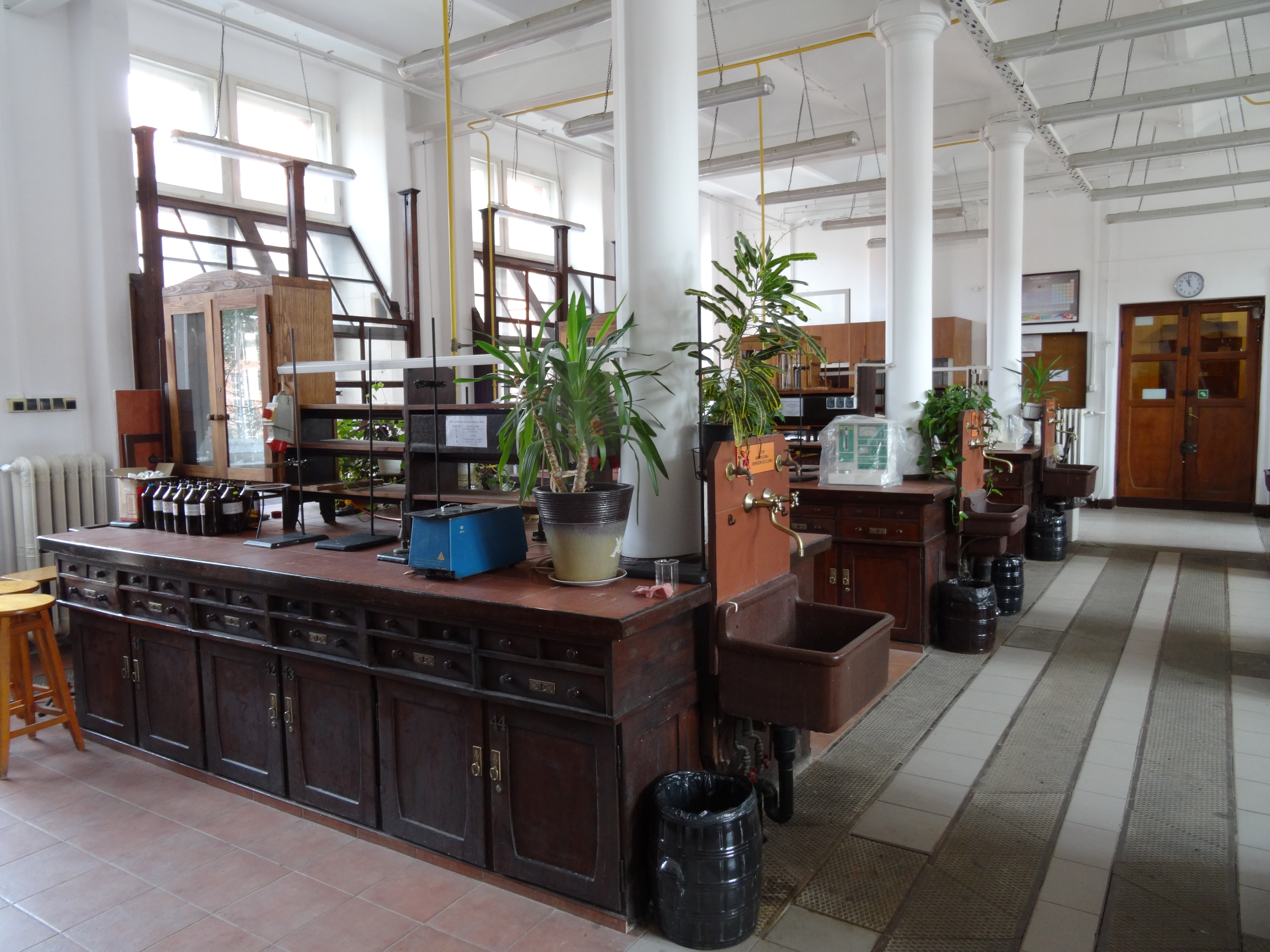
Student laboratory

The Chemical Faculty was one of the four original faculties of the university and one of five faculties that began operational research and teaching in 1945 as a result of the decree by the Polish government transforming technical universities active in Gdańsk since 1904 into the Polish Gdańsk University of Technology.

At the faculty, there are projects financed by the State Committee for Scientific Research and the European Commission. The Centre of Excellence in Environmental Analysis and Monitoring operates within the faculty. Additionally, there are research programmes financed by the European Commission under the EU’s V and VI framework programmes.

== Academic Computer Centre ==
The Academic Computer Centre in Gdańsk (CI TASK) has operated since 1992 under an agreement between the Tri-City’s chief higher education institutions. It was initially established to serve all higher education establishments and local branches of the Polish Academy of Sciences.

== Library ==
The library holds over a million volumes, including electronic publications. It features 16 reading rooms and has contributed to the development of the Universal Library.

== Notable alumni ==
- Bodo von Borries (1905–1956), German physicist, co-inventor of electron microscope
- Krystyna Chojnowska-Liskiewicz (1936-2021), naval engineer, first woman to have sailed single-handed (i.e. solo) around the world
- Zygmunt Choreń (born 1941), naval architect
- Jaroslaw Drelich (1957), surface engineer, professor at the Michigan Technological University
- Abraham Esau (1884–1955), German physicist
- Andrzej Gwiazda (born 1935), anti-communist activist and physicist
- Richard B. Hetnarski (born 1928), Polish-American mechanical engineer
- Tomasz Imieliński (born 1954), Polish-American computer scientist
- Michał Kalecki (1899–1970), Marxian economist, "one of the most distinguished economists of the 20th century"
- Włodzimierz Julian Korab-Karpowicz (born 1953), philosopher and political theorist
- Alar Kotli (1904–1963), Estonian architect
- Janusz Liberkowski (born 1953), inventor
- Lâm Quang Mỹ (born 1944), Polish-Vietnamese physicist and poet
- Jacek Namieśnik (1949–2019), chemist
- Janusz Pawliszyn (born 1954), chemist
- Marek Piechocki (born 1961), civil engineer, co-founder of LPP Group
- Kazimierz Piechowski (1919–2017), engineer
- Krystian Pilarczyk (born 1941), hydraulic engineer
- Marianna Sankiewicz-Budzyńska (1921–2018), electronics engineer
- Janusz Smulko (born 1964), electronics engineer
- Wojciech Szpankowski (born 1952), computer scientist
