= Vilde =

Female given name and family name

Vilde is both a surname and a feminine given name. Notable people with the name include:

== Surname ==
- Ain Vilde (born 1942), Estonian ice yachter and sailor
- Boris Vildé (1908–1942), French linguist
- Eduard Vilde (1865–1933), Estonian writer and diplomat
- Iryna Vilde (1907–1982), Ukrainian writer
- Raimonds Vilde (born 1962), Latvian volleyball player and coach
- Ričmonds Vilde (born 1990), Latvian basketball player

== Given name ==
- Vilde Frang (born 1986), Norwegian classical violinist
- Vilde Ingstad (born 1994), Norwegian handball player
- Vilde Johansen (born 1994), Norwegian handball player
- Vilde Lockert (born 1970), Norwegian singer and musician
- Vilde Nilsen (born 2001), Norwegian Paralympic cross-country skier and biathlete
