= Wilder Smith =

Wilder Smith (July 17, 1835 – September 1, 1891) was an American minister and author.

Wilder Smith, son of George W. and Kate (Wilder) Smith, was born on July 17, 1835, in Boston, Mass. While at Yale College his family resided in Albany, New York.

After graduation in 1857, he taught in the Hopkins Grammar School in New Haven, and from 1858 to 1861 pursued the regular course of study in the Yale Divinity School. He was also for nearly two years (1860–63) a tutor at Yale. On January 15, 1862, he was ordained pastor of the Congregational Church in Berlin, Connecticut, and resigned his charge on October 30, 1866. He then went to Wisconsin, and on January 17, 1867, was installed over the Hanover Street (Congregational) Church in Milwaukee. He was dismissed from this pastorate on August 31, 1871, and on October 1, 1872, he was again settled over the Congregational Church in Rockford, Illinois, where he remained for eleven years. He then established his residence in Hartford, Conn., where he continued, engaged in literary work and private studies, until his death, which occurred there, from heart-failure, after an illness of several months, on September 1, 1891, in his 57th year. He was a man of rare scholarly attainments, and published in 1884 a volume of Reminiscences of the Rev. Gustavus F. Davis, D.D., of Hartford. He also published a small volume on Extempore Preaching, which has been adopted as a text-book in several theological schools.

He married on June 12, 1862, Charlotte M., elder daughter of Gustavus F. Davis Jr., of Hartford, who survived him, with two daughters.
