= De Wild Family =

The De Wild Family
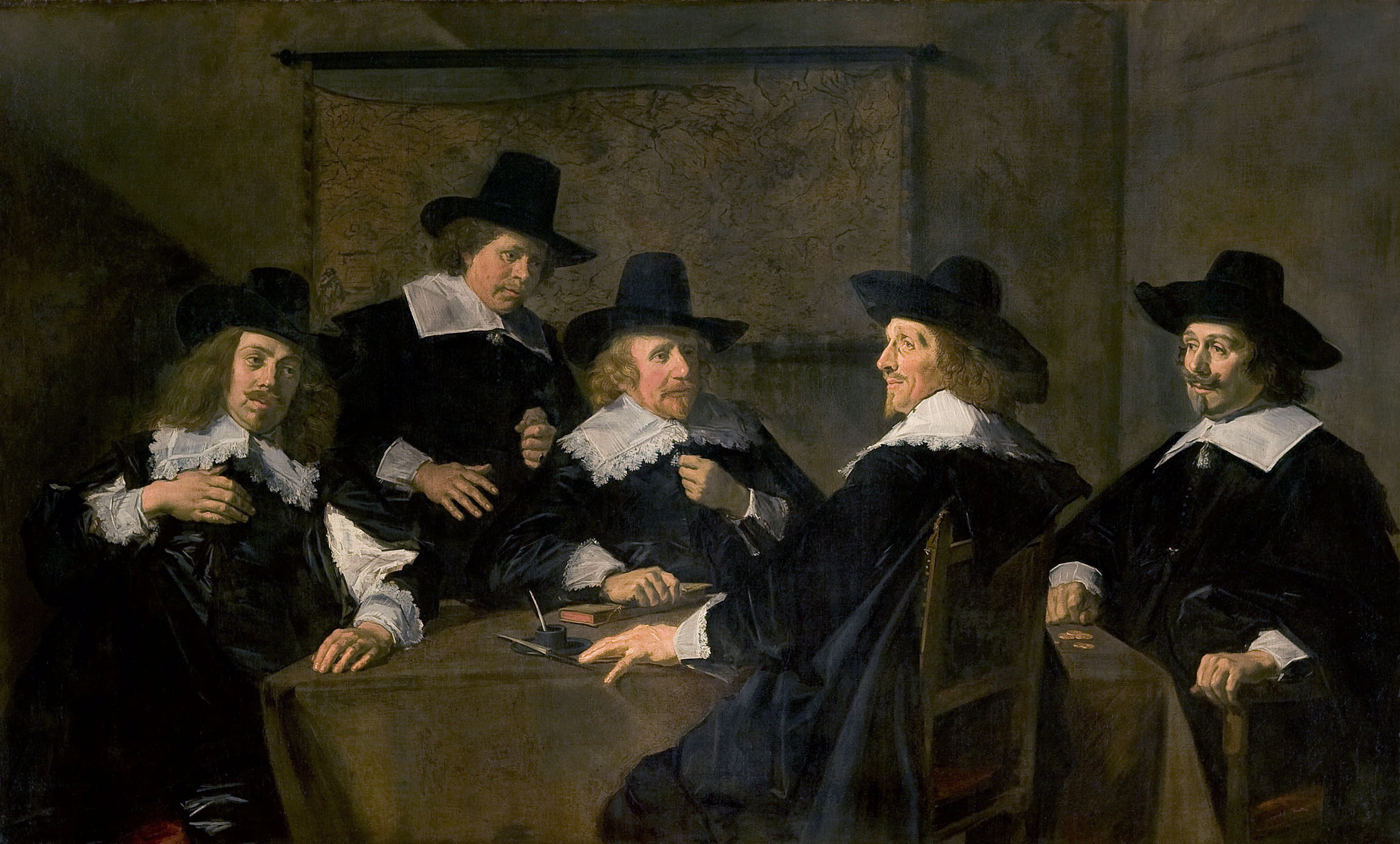
- Regents of the St. Elisabeth's Hospital, Haarlem, 1641. One of twelve Frans Hals group portraits that all four De Wild restorers worked to conserve.
- Current region: Netherlands / United States (The Hague, Netherlands / New York)
- Members: Carel F. L. de Wild, Derix de Wild, A. Martin de Wild, C. F. Louis de Wild

The De Wild family was a Dutch family of art professionals, including conservator-restorers, art dealers, painters, and connoisseurs. Prominent internationally in the late nineteenth century and into the twentieth century, they were especially known for their advances in art restoration.

== Carel de Wild ==
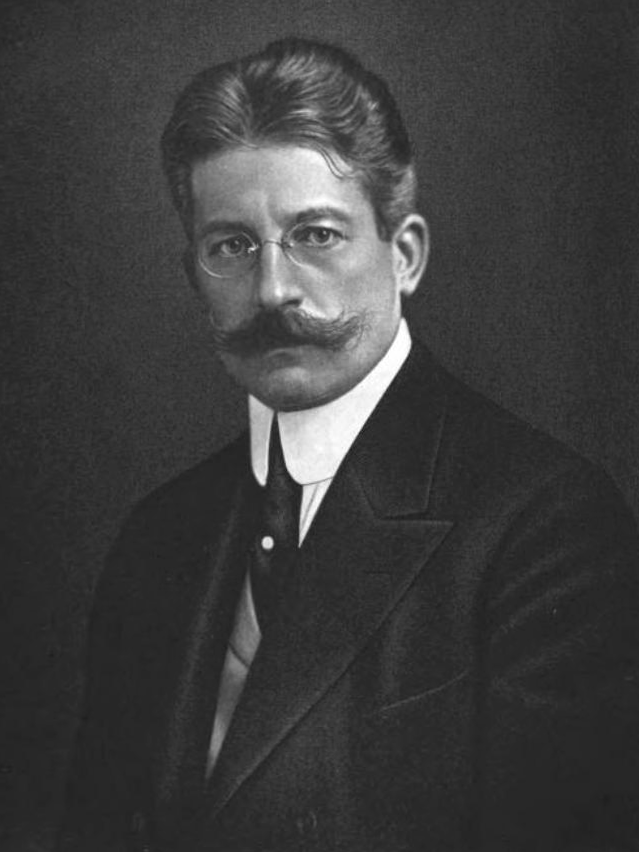

Carel de Wild was born on August 26, 1870, to Angenita Mertina Visser de Wild of Kessel, Limburg. He began his career in the arts early, studying at the Royal Academy of Art, The Hague from the age of 13. Though he was initially trained in painting, the retirement of the Netherlands's top restorer Willem Anthonij Hopman necessitated a successor, and art historians Abraham Bredius and Hofstede de Groot nominated Carel for this role. Beginning in 1894, he studied restoration in Vienna and later Berlin on a scholarship from the Queen Dowager of the Netherlands. He worked at a studio in the Hague from 1895 until 1911, garnering commissions such as the controversial re-varnishing of twelve Frans Hals group portraits in Haarlem.

=== United States ===
After working with Goupil & Cie in Paris, Carel received an offer to work as an advisor and restorer with art dealing institution Knoedler & Co, and departed for the United States in 1911. During his time with Knoedler & Co., and subsequently at the independent practice on Fifth Avenue he opened in 1916, he worked closely with American industrialists Henry Clay Frick, Joseph Widener, and J.P. Morgan. He advised Frick on several major art purchases in the 1910s, including Vermeer's Mistress and Maid, Gilbert Stuart's portrait of George Washington, and a Jacob Maris landscape, later restoring Frick's prized Rembrandt self-portrait. Well-known as the first to bring the so-called "Dutch method" of wax-resin lining outside the Netherlands, he was called in by a government art appraiser to give his expert opinion on a case of suspected art fraud in 1916. A firm proponent of investigating the physical properties, as much as the stylistic ones, of a given artwork, he came to disagree strongly with certain attributions made by his former mentor Bredius. In 1921, he accepted a position as professor of Fine Art at the University of Pennsylvania, teaching the "technique and care of paintings." There, he was only able to give two lectures before retiring due to ill health, and died on May 12, 1922, at his home in Larchmont, New York.

== Derix de Wild ==
After Carel's departure for the United States in 1911, the Haarlem Committee of Supervision nominated his older brother, Derix, to continue restoring the city's twelve Hals group portraits. Like Carel, he worked at the Mauritshuis, developing a close professional relationship with then-director Wilhelm Martin that led to several collaborative projects, often scientific in nature. For example, in July 1916, in response to a threat of chemical attack, they tested the effects of lye on a series of "dummy" paintings in order to discover which brand of fire extinguisher was best suited to saving an artwork. Derix is also thought to have assisted Martin in his publications on conservation and restoration. In his continuation of the Hals project at Haarlem, he brought in the chemist Gosen van der Sleen to aid in his analysis. This was the first known case in the Netherlands of a chemist advising on a painting restoration project. With Van der Sleen's approval, he continued the restoration as planned, working with his son A.M., nephew C. F. Louis, and brother Carel to re-varnish the paintings. Although he published little himself, save for an article in the Kurt Walter Bachstitz Gallery Bulletin, he remained well-occupied with his restoration business in the Hague until his death on December 4, 1932.

== A. Martin de Wild ==
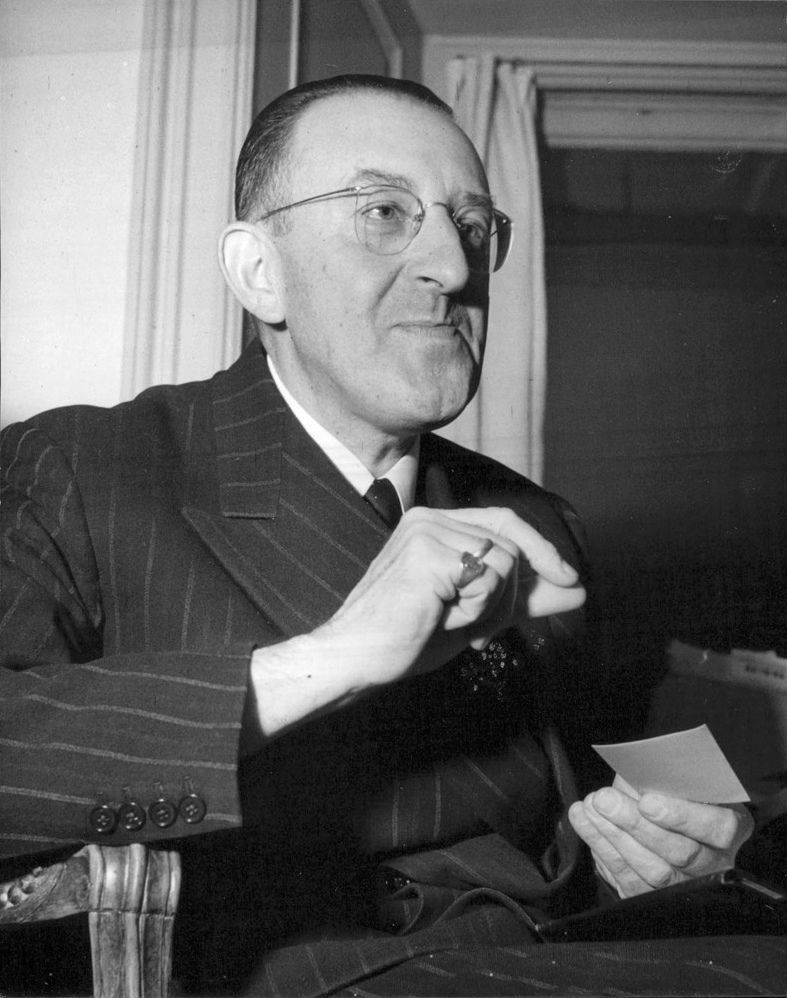
A. Martin de Wild in 1947.

Angenitus Martin de Wild, known as A. M. or Martin, was Derix de Wild's son. He sought to further the chemical approach to restoration promoted by his father and uncle. To this end, he enrolled at the Delft University of Technology, completing a doctorate degree in inorganic chemistry in 1928. His book The Scientific Examination of Pictures, originally completed as part of his chemistry thesis, was soon published internationally. Taking paint samples from a variety of European masterpieces, he studied the chemical makeup of synthetic pigments used in oil painting over time. After Martin's death, the book was considered a "landmark" for its technical analysis of pigmentation. Martin's heavily technical method of art analysis and formal chemical training were a relative novelty. He went on to some renown for his involvement in forgery trials throughout the 1930s and 1940s, including the highly publicized Otto Wacker trial in 1932 and the Han van Meegeren trial in 1946. He lectured at the University of Utrecht from 1938 until 1947. Working privately in his studio in the Hague, Martin published widely until his death in 1969, often collaborating with colleagues from the Delft University of Technology and the International Institute for Conservation.

== C. F. Louis de Wild ==
Carel de Wild's son C. F. Louis trained with his uncle Derix for much of his youth, eventually establishing his own restoration practice. Immigrating to the United States from The Hague after his father's death, he opened an independent conservation studio in New York City in 1929. He worked in conjunction with American museums like the Metropolitan Museum of Art, the National Gallery of Art, and, like his father before him, the Frick Collection. Notable paintings he restored include the Alba Madonna and multiple works by Piero della Francesca. He retired from his conservation practice in 1969, and died in 1987 at the age of 86.
