= Krzysztof Wilde =

- Born: 11 January 1966 (age 60); Gdańsk, Poland
- Citizenship: Polish
- Education: Gdańsk University of Technology
- Scientific career
- Fields: Structural mechanics, Theory of structures
- Thesis: Aerodynamiczne sterowanie mostami o dużych rozpiętościach za pomocą aktywnych powierzchni (1997)

Krzysztof Wilde (born 11 January 1966 in Gdańsk) – Polish engineer, full professor of civil engineering, Rector of Gdańsk University of Technology since 3 June 2019

== Professional career ==
Expert in bridge structures, structural mechanics and diagnostics of civil structures. Head of the Department of Mechanics of Materials and Structures (1995–2019), dean of Faculty of Civil Engineering of Gdańsk University of Technology in cadences 2004-2008 and 2016–2020. Member of the Committee on Civil Engineering and Hydroengineering of the Polish Academy of Sciences and Committee on Mechanics of the Polish Academy of Sciences. Author or co-author of over 200 publications and 4 patents. In 1995-1999 he was working at the Tokyo University achieving position of associate professor.

Since 2020 chairman of the Fahrenheit Union of Universities in Gdańsk.
