= Rebeca Wild =

Rebeca Wild (1939 in Berlin – 2015 in Tumbaco, Quito) was a German educator and author in Ecuador.

== Life and work ==
Rebeca Wild lived in Ecuador with her husband Mauricio Wild from 1961. Both worked first as managers of a plantation, then as employees of an import-export company in the harbour city of Guayaquil. From 1965 to 1970, she studied social sciences in New York and Puerto Rico and then returned to Ecuador to manage an agricultural development project in the Andes.

In 1980, Rebeca Wild and her husband opened a primary school and in 1986 a secondary school in Quito, Ecuador. They founded non-directive education. In 1989, the so-called learning environment Pesta was recognised as an experimental school for Ecuador. Since 1989, the institution has been authorised to award a secondary school leaving certificate equivalent to the German Realschulabschluss. The young people were able to continue studying at Pesta for the school-leaving examination as external students; after appropriate preparation, many went on to pass the school-leaving examination in state or private courses. Their work and the books describing it were the motivation for a number of alternative schools, most of which called themselves "active schools".

The concept was based on the pedagogy of Maria Montessori and the developmental model of Jean Piaget. In their school, they have expanded the prepared environment, as proposed and developed by Montessori pedagogy, to include spaces in which children and young people can fulfil their needs for free movement, concrete experiences with unstructured materials or conversations with each other. After the Pesta closed in 2010, Rebeca Wild was involved in setting up the León Dormido (=sleeping lion), a community project near Quito for living, learning and doing business in the service of life. The theoretical reflection of her work is based on the findings of the Chilean biologist Humberto Maturana.

== Selected works ==
- Erziehung zum Sein. Erfahrungsbericht einer aktiven Schule. Arbor-Verlag, Freiamt 1986, ISBN 3-924195-03-X.
- Sein zum Erziehen. Mit Kindern leben lernen. Arbor-Verlag, Freiamt 1991, ISBN 3-924195-08-0.
- Kinder im Pesta. Erfahrungen auf dem Weg zu einer vorbereiteten Umgebung für Kinder. Arbor-Verlag, Freiamt 1993, ISBN 3-924195-10-2.
- Freiheit und Grenzen – Liebe und Respekt. Was Kinder von uns brauchen. Mit Kindern wachsen Verlag, Freiamt 1998, ISBN 3-933020-03-4.
- Kinder wissen, was sie brauchen; Herder, Freiburg (Breisgau) 1998, ISBN 3-451-04605-9.
- Lebensqualität für Kinder und andere Menschen. Erziehung und der Respekt für das innere Wachstum von Kindern und Jugendlichen; Beltz, Weinheim u. a. 2001, ISBN 3-407-22092-8.
- Genügend gute Eltern. Erwachsene und Jugendliche im Dialog über Lebensprozesse, Schule und Fremdbestimmung; Beltz, Weinheim 2006, ISBN 3-407-22878-3.
- Raising Curious, Creative, Confident Kids. The Pestalozzi Experiment in Child-Based Education; Shambhala, Boston MA 2000, ISBN 1-570-62455-0.
