= Maria de Wilde =

Dutch artist, writer (1682–1729)

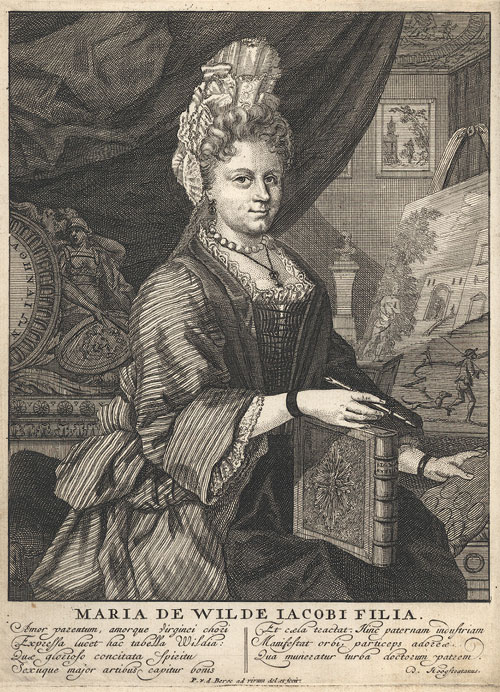
Maria de Wilde, engraving ca. 1700

Maria de Wilde (7 January 1682 – 11 April 1729) was a Dutch engraver and playwright of the Dutch Republic. She was born and died in Amsterdam, where she played an active part in the upper-class bourgeois world of artists and writers, and gained a reputation by engraving her wealthy father's art collection. Formerly credited also with four plays, modern scholars only ascribe a tragedy and possibly a comedy to her.

== Biography ==
Maria de Wilde was one of eight children of Jacob de Wilde, a high-ranking official (collector-general) in the Admiralty of Amsterdam and Hendrina Veen; on her mother's side she was descended from the religious leader Jacobus Arminius, and the family continued the adherence to Remonstrantism. Two of her siblings died young. The family was well-off and for a while rented a house on the Keizersgracht canal, before they bought the building and the adjacent homes. De Wilde remained single until relatively late for her period; in 1710, she married Gijsbert de Lange (1677–1758?), also an official with the Admiralty. They had two children, one of whom reached adulthood; the other died shortly after birth. There appears to have been some doubt about her death date: earlier biographies list it as unknown, as does de Jeu's 2000 study of women poets of the Dutch Republic. Van Oostrum's 2013 article for the Digitaal Vrouwenlexicon van Nederland, however, has 11 April 1729 as a death date; she was laid to rest in the family grave in the Oude Kerk in Amsterdam.

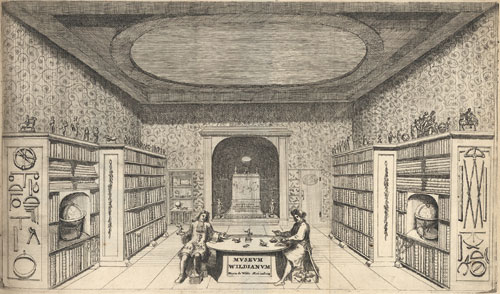
Engraving of Jacob de Wilde (left) and Peter the Great

Maria was well-educated and while not much is known of her life, all evidence indicates she was a cultured person with artistic talent; she was praised for her singing voice, her poetry, and her harpsichord playing. She learned engraving from Adriaan Schoonebeek. Her father had an impressive art collection which brought many visitors including the Russian tsar Peter the Great, who visited the de Wilde family to admire the collection on 13 December 1697. Maria made an engraving of this meeting between the tsar and her father, which marks "the beginning of the West European classical tradition in Russia". In 1717, on his second visit, she gave him a print of the engraving: he reciprocated by giving her a jewel.

She earned a national reputation as an engraver with the work she did for the catalogs of her father's collection. Fifty-five engravings of Egyptian, Greek, and Roman sculptures were published in Signa antiqua e museo Jacobi de Wilde in 1700, and Gemma selecta antiqua e museo Jacobi de Wilde (1703) contained 188 engravings of coins and engraved gems. One of her admirers was the German lawyer and poet Andreas Lange, who found her at work in her father's house and became enamored with her. A Latin poem praising her was translated into Dutch. She was also praised in poetry by the scholar, cartographer, and philologist Adriaan Reland.

== Drama ==
De Wilde was formerly often credited with four plays in verse, all translations or adaptations of existing works. Her first play, Abradates en Panthea, was published anonymously with the motto Sine Pallade nihil ("nothing without Pallas") on the title page, a phrase with which she became associated. While contemporaries (and some modern critics) considered it a translation of François Tristan l'Hermite's Penthée (1637), it may well be inspired by Xenophon's Cyropaedia. While her name was left off the title page, the dedicatory poems clearly identified her by name.

After her marriage she stopped publishing, and while she may have died in 1729, a farce, Het zwervende portret, appeared in 1742 with her name and motto on the title page; the play is an adaptation of Pierre-François Godard de Beauchamps's Le portrait. Two further plays published in 1755 have the motto in it: the comedy De bekroonde Boere-rijmer (possibly a translation of a 1726 German play) and the farce Don Domingo Gonzales of de Man in de maan. Whether the 1742 play is de Wilde's or not is a matter of dispute, with van Oostrum's biography stating that the motto appears in a poem written after de Wilde's death and that spelling variations between the four occurrences also point to different authors. That the other two are hers is currently denied by critics.
