= Wilder (surname) =

Wilder or Van Wilder is a surname, and may refer to:

== A ==
- A. Carter Wilder (1828–1875), American businessman and politician
- Ace Wilder (born 1982), Swedish singer
- Alan Wilder (born 1959), British electronic musician
- Alan Wilder (actor) (born 1953), American actor
- Alec Wilder (1907–1980), American composer and songwriter
- Allen W. Wilder (born c. 1843), American state legislator, teacher and lawyer in Texas
- Almanzo Wilder (1859–1949), American farmer
- Amos Wilder (1895–1993), American poet, minister and academic theologian
- Amos Parker Wilder (1862–1936), American journalist and diplomat
- Andrew Wilder (American football) (born 1990), American football player
- Andrew S. Wilder, American television writer and producer
- Annelies Wilder-Smith (born 1961), infectiology academic
- Arch Wilder (1917–2002), Canadian ice hockey player
- Arthur A. Wilder (1873–1917), American judge
- A. E. Wilder-Smith (1915–1995), British chemist

== B ==
- Bert Wilder (1939–2012), American football player
- Billy Wilder (1906–2002), Austrian-born American film director
- Bob Wilder (c.1921–1953), American racing driver
- Bobby Wilder (born 1964), American college football coach
- Burt Green Wilder (1841–1925), American comparative anatomist

== C ==
- Charles McDuffie Wilder (c.1835–1902), American public official and politician in South Carolina
- Charlotte Frances Wilder (1839–1916), American writer
- Cherry Wilder, pseudonym of New Zealand writer Cherry Barbara Grimm (1930–2002)
- Chris Wilder (born 1967), English football player and manager
- Christopher Wilder (1944–1984), American serial rapist and murderer
- Clint Wilder, American business journalist
- Craig Steven Wilder, American historian

== D ==
- Dash Wilder (born 1987), American professional wrestler
- David Wilder Jr. (1778–1866), American politician
- David Wilder (activist), American leader of Israeli settlers
- David Wilder (baseball) (born 1960), American Major League Baseball executive
- Dennis Wilder, American intelligence official and academix=c
- Deontay Wilder (born 1985), American heavyweight boxer
- Donald Wilder (1926–2010), Canadian cinematographer and documentarian
- Douglas Wilder (born 1931), American politician, Governor of Virginia

== E ==
- Effie Wilder (1909–2007), American writer

== F ==
- Frances Farmer Wilder, American radio executive

== G ==
- Gene Wilder (1933–2016), American actor
- George Wilder (cricketer) (1876–1948), English cricketer
- George Wilder (criminal) (born 1962), prison escaper and New Zealand folk hero
- George H. Wilder (1870–1959), American politician
- Gertrude B. Wilder (1874–1955), American clubwoman

== H ==
- Hal Wilder (1893–1989), American football player
- Harris Hawthorne Wilder (1864–1928), American zoologist
- Harvey A. Wilder (1907–1968), American farmer and politician
- Henry Wilder (cricketer) (1798–1836), English cricketer
- Henry L. Wilder (1883–1962), American football and basketball coach and newspaper publisher
- Hilary Wilder, American visual artist and educator
- Horace Wilder (1802–1889), American politician and judge from Ohio

== I ==
- Ilan Van Wilder (born 2000), Belgian cyclist
- Inez Whipple Wilder (1871–1929), American zoologist
- Isabel Wilder (1900–1995), American novelist, biographer and patron of the arts

== J ==
- James Wilder Sr. (born 1958), American football running back
- James Wilder Jr. (born 1992), American football running back
- James Wilder (actor) (born 1968), American film and television actor
- James A. Wilder (1868–1934), American artist and writer from Hawaii
- Joe Wilder (1922–2014), American jazz trumpeter, bandleader and composer
- John Wilder (producer) (born 1936), American actor, television producer and writer
- John Shelton Wilder (1921–2010), American politician, Lieutenant Governor of Tennessee
- John R. Wilder (1816–1879), American businessman
- John T. Wilder (1830–1917), American Civil War general
- Johnnie Wilder Jr. (1949–2006), American musician
- J. Welles Wilder, Jr. (1935–2021), American mechanical engineer, best known for his work in technical analysis
- Joseph M. Wilder (1918–1990), American politician
- Josh Wilder (born 1990), American playwright

== K ==
- Kate Wilder, U.S. Army officer
- Kathryn Wilder, English stage and film actress
- Kurtis T. Wilder (born 1959), American judge

== L ==
- Lance Wilder (born 1968), American animator
- Latisha Wilder (born 1975), American figure competitor
- Laura Ingalls Wilder (1867–1957), American writer
- Lawrence D. Wilder Jr. (born 1962), American politician
- Louise Beebe Wilder (1878–1938), American gardening writer
- Lucy Leavenworth Wilder (1865–1935), American historian and teacher
- Lynn Wilder (born 1952), American author and academic

== M ==
- Madleen Wilder (born 1980), German footballer
- Marshall Pinckney Wilder (actor) (1859–1915), American actor and humorist
- Marshall Pinckney Wilder (politician) (1798–1886), American merchant and politician
- Martha Andresen Wilder (1944–2018), American scholar of Renaissance literature
- Matthew Wilder (born 1953), American musician
- Maurice Wilder-Neligan (1882–1923), Australian soldier
- Michael Wilder (born 1962), American chess champion
- Michael O. Wilder (born 1941), American politician from Wisconsin
- Mitchell Wilder (1913–1979), American arts administrator, scholar and photographer
- Myles Wilder (1933–2010), American television comedy writer and producer

== N ==
- Nicholas Wilder (1937–1989), American art dealer and gallerist

== O ==
- O'Neal Wilder (born 1989), American sprinter
- Oshea Wilder (1784–1846), American pioneer in Michigan

== P ==
- Patricia "Honeychile" Wilder (1913–1995), American film actress
- Petra Wilder-Smith, dentistry academic and researcher
- Philip van Wilder (c.1500–1554), lutenist and composer from the Habsburg Netherlands
- Philip Wilder (born 1968), American counter-tenor

== Q ==
- Quinn Wilder, Canadian author

== R ==
- Raymond Louis Wilder (1896–1982), American mathematician
- Robert Wilder (environmentalist) (born 1960), American businessman, environmental activist and academic
- Robert Wilder (novelist) (1901–1974), American novelist, playwright and screenwriter
- Robert Parmelee Wilder (1863–1938), American Protestant missionary
- Roger William Wilder, III, American politician
- Rose Wilder Lane (1886–1968), American writer from Louisiana
- Russell Morse Wilder (1885–1959), American physician and medical researcher

== S ==
- Sam Wilder (American football) (born 1933), American football player
- Samuel Gardner Wilder (1831–1888), American shipping magnate and politician
- S. Fannie Gerry Wilder (1850–1923), American writer
- Stefanie Wilder-Taylor, American humorist

== T ==
- Terri L. Wilder, American social worker and AIDS activist
- Terry Wilder, American biblical scholar
- Theaker Wilder (1717–1778), Anglo-Irish academic
- Thomas Wilder (born 1995), American basketball player
- Thornton Wilder (1897–1975), American writer
- Tiffany Spann-Wilder, American attorney and politician from South Carolina

== V ==
- Val Wilder (born 1959), American tennis player
- Većeslav Wilder (1878–1961), Croatian and Yugoslavian politician

== W ==
- W. Lee Wilder (1904–1982), Austrian-born American screenwriter, film producer and director
- Webb Wilder (born 1954), American singer-songwriter
- Wilber Elliott Wilder (1857–1952), American brigadier general
- William Wilder (1855–1913), American lawyer and politician

== Y ==
- Yvonne Wilder (1937–2021), American actress, comedian, writer and artist

== See also ==
- Wilders (surname)
