= David Wilder =

David Wilder may refer to:

- David Wilder (baseball) (born 1960), former Major League Baseball executive
- David Wilder (activist), leader of Israeli settlers in Hebron
- David Wilder, Jr. (1778–1866), American politician in Massachusetts
