= Robert Wilder =

Robert Wilder may refer to:

- Robert Wilder (environmentalist) (born 1960), American businessman, environmental activist, and academic
- Robert Wilder (novelist) (1901–1974), American novelist, playwright and screenwriter
- Robert Parmelee Wilder (1863–1938), missionary
- Bob Wilder (c. 1921–1953), American racing driver
- Bobby Wilder (born 1964), American college football coach

== See also ==
- Robert O. Wilder Building, a historic plantation mansion on the campus of Tougaloo College in Tougaloo, Mississippi
