= Andrew Wilder =

Andrew Wilder may refer to:

- Andrew Wilder (American football) (born 1990), American football player
- Andrew S. Wilder, American television writer and producer
