= Royal Gould Wilder =

American Christian missionary in Maharashtra, India

The Reverend Royal Gould Wilder
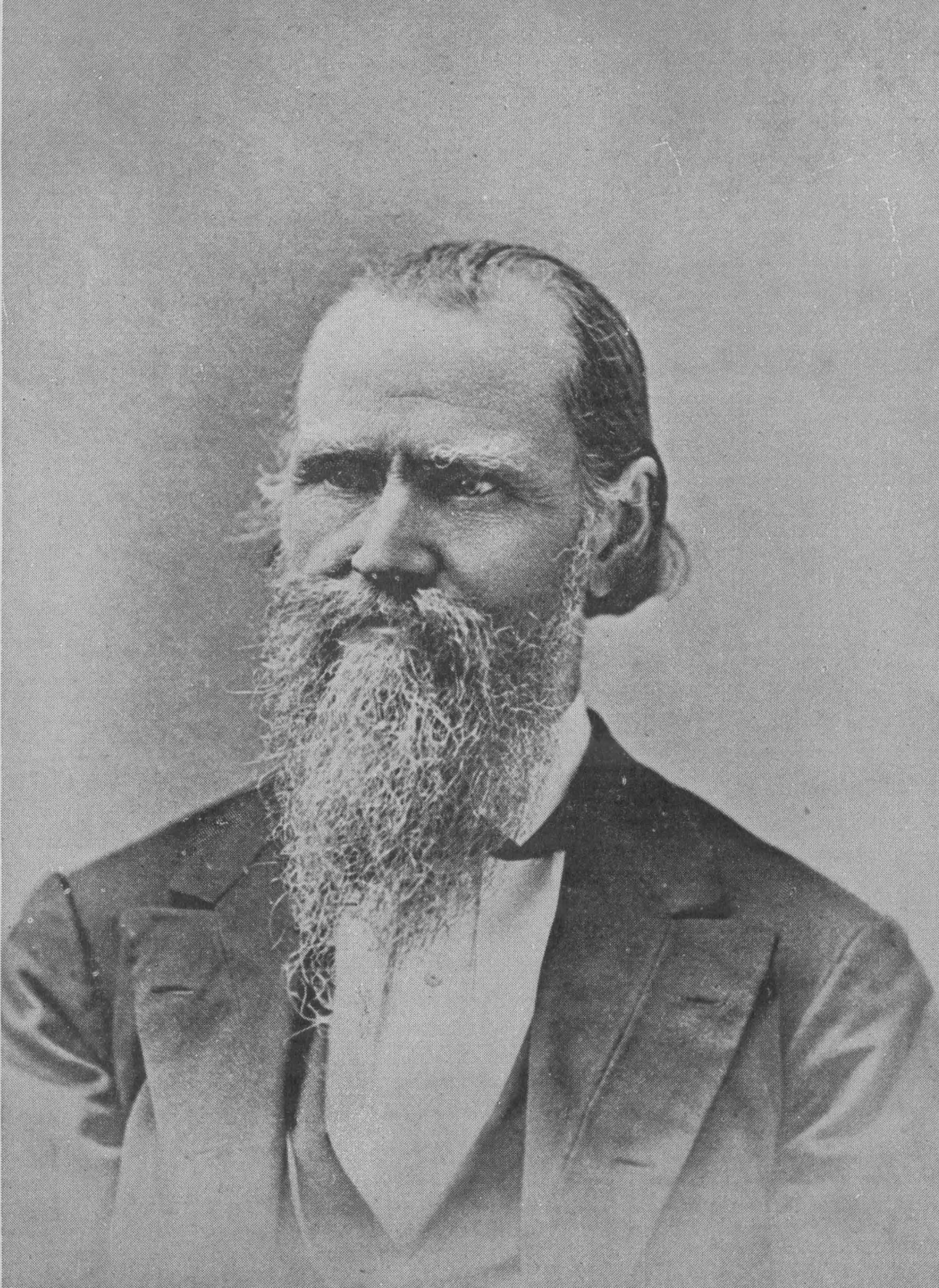
- Wilder in 1888
- Born: October 27, 1816; Bridport, Vermont, U.S.
- Died: October 10, 1887 (aged 70); New York City, U.S.
- Occupation: Missionary
- Relatives: Almanzo Wilder (nephew)

Royal Gould Wilder (October 27, 1816 – October 10, 1887) was an American Christian missionary. He worked in the principality of Kolhapur for the American Board of Commissioners for Foreign Missions from 1846 to 1860, as an independent missionary from 1862 to 1870 and finally under the American Presbyterian Mission from 1870 till 1875.

Royal Gould along with his wife Elizabeth Jane Smith laid the foundation of systematic education in the area of Kolhapur principality and founded eight schools in the principality

In 1857, he founded the Wilder Memorial Church, Kolhapur.

== Early life and education ==
Royal Gould Wilder was born to Abel Wilder and Hannah Paine on October 27, 1816. He was the uncle of American farmer Almanzo Wilder and his brother Gould Wilder, the latter of whom took after his name. His father Abel Wilder worked as a ship-carpenter in Portland.

As a child, Royal Gould was deeply attracted to Christianity and converted at the age of 13 during a revival meeting. He studied at the Vermont's Middlebury College and passed at top of his class. Wilder was also impacted by the Haystack Prayer Meeting and had decided to become a missionary for the non-believers.

He taught for 2 years before joining the Andover Theological Seminary. While at Andover Wilder was part of the Society of Inquiry on missions as well as the more secret "Society of the Brethren"

== Life as a missionary ==
=== Missionary with ABCFM (1846-1861) ===
Royal Gould Wilder joined the American Board of Commissioners for Foreign Missions with his wife Elizabeth as missionaries and in 1846, left for India along with Samuel B. Fairbank.

==== Work in Ahmednagar ====
They arrived in Ahmednagar in Maharashtra where he worked as a missionary and a teacher for 6 years between 1846 and 1852. At Ahmednagar, he learned a lot from Cynthia Farrar, an earlier American missionary.

Wilder was put in charge of the boarding school at Ahmednagar and was equally responsible for six elementary schools in Ahmednagar. He additionally saw to the establishment of twenty schools in the nearby villages.

Wilder's firm beliefs and strong viewpoints brought him in conflict with the administration and the board. He was transferred to Kolhapur to set up a new mission.

==== Work in Kolhapur ====
Royal Gould Wilder was tasked to establish a new mission station in Kolhapur, Maharashtra which previously had no missionary presence – the nearest station was at Satara, about 60 miles away, and travel difficulties made it difficult to access. Wilder and his wife arrived in Kolhapur on 4 December 1852, residing in a military bungalow near Rankala Lake.

On his arrival, local religious leaders petitioned King Shivaji IV (Babasaheb Maharaj), the Raja of Kolhapur to expel him. But after consulting Major Douglas Graham, the political superintendent who supported Wilder's educational work, the king dismissed the opposition, marking a shift in policy toward missionaries.

Wilder established a school that began with two boys and grew to over 200 boys and 20 girls within a year. His wife Elizabeth Wilder played a key role in encouraging families to educate their daughters, and the number of female students rose to 120 within a few years. Members of the royal family also enrolled their children, reflecting close ties between the Wilders and the Kolhapur rulers.

The mission's influence soon extended beyond education. Two Brahmin teachers sought baptism, and the first convert was Govind Appa Chavan, a distant relative of the king and a member of a regent family. His baptism on April 5, 1857 is considered the foundation of the Wilder Memorial Church.

The ABCFM board under Rufus Anderson commission recommended stopping any educational work and closing of Kolhapur station for a few reasons. As the station was outside of British authority, as Kolhapur was under the independent rule of the family of Shahu Maharaj. There were also discussions in the mission about teaching in English versus the vernacular language in which Wilder did not seek rapid conversions but instead, emphasized that local people should first gain a full understanding of the Gospel before baptism.

Wilder returned to the United States due to medical reasons and tried unsuccessfully to convince the board for the reinstatement of the closed Kolhapur mission. In the meantime the church building he had built in Kolhapur was sold off by the mission in India.

=== Independent missionary (1862–1870) ===
Royal Gould Wilder's work was recognized and respected by his presbytery and supporting churches. After the ABCFM discontinued the Kolhapur mission, he chose to continue the work independently, without backing from the ABCFM or any other missionary board. However, he did receive support from the Presbytery of Champlain in the Albany Synod, as well as from friends who sympathized with his efforts.

Wilder was also helped in his independent mission by Sir Bartle Frere, Governor of Bombay, Colonel Phayre and Robert Arthington of Leeds.

Wilder re-established the church in Kolhapur in 1862, erecting a new building near the original site at his own expense. Wilder still had good relations with the ruler of Kolhapur and resumed his educational work.

After working for 7 years indendently, Wilder returned to the United States in 1870 and decided to handover the working of his mission to the Presbyterian Church in the United States.

=== Missionary with American Presbyterian Mission (1870-75) ===
In the United States, New School Presbyterians initially worked with the ABCFM, however there were some disputes regarding the working of ABCFM, one of the issue was not allowing the growth of denominational church and also the Wilder episode.

Until 1869, the New School Presbyterians worked with the ABCFM. In 1869 the New School Presbyterians re-united with the Presbyterian Church in the United States and Wilder handed over his independent mission to the church and in 1870 returned to India as a PCUSA missionary.

This time Wilder was also joined by another missionaries like Rev. Galen W. Seiler and Joseph M. Goheen along with their wives; Mrs. J. J. Hull, Mrs. R. G. Wilder and Miss Grace E. Wilder. By then, the mission was in a stable condition and education had taken root in Kolhapur. The ruler of Kolhapur had established a brand new school called "Rajaram High School" and Wilder now spent more time focusing on missionary work.

During this period the S.P.G.Mission (Society for the Propagation of the Gospel) had also started their work in Kolhapur which conflicted with the work of Presbyterian missionaries.

There were also some groupism in the churches based on previous castes. Wilder worked to develop a spirit of Catholic Christianity and Unity between all the groups and denominations.

Wilder finally returned to the United States for the last time in 1875 due to ill health and to focus on the education of his children after about 30 years of missionary service.

Royal Gould Wilder died on 10 October 1887.

== Impact and legacy ==
The work done in the field of education in Ahmednagar and Kolhapur was useful for upliftment of the local people and especially the girls.

Over his 30 years of missionary service, Royal Gould Wilder preached in more than 3000 villages, towns and cities, distributed over 3,000,000 pages of tracts. He oversaw the education of more than 3,300 pupils, 300 of them girls.

The journal started by Rev. Wilder - "The Missionary Review of the World" was a periodical that reported on Protestant Christian missionary work globally, published from 1878 to 1939. It served as a key source of information and inspiration for missionary societies and individuals involved in spreading the Christian faith. Wilder served as the editor from 1878 till his death in 1887.

The church founded by Wilder is known today as the Wilder Memorial Church in Kolhapur and is one of the largest congregation in Southern Maharashtra, India.

Rev. Wilder's son Robert Parmalee Wilder worked among youths through Student Volunteer Movement and YMCA.

== Publications ==
- Missionary Review of the World
- Mission Schools in India of the American Board of Commissioners for Foreign Missions
- Commentary on the Gospels of Matthew & Mark
- Commentary on the Gospel according to Luke
- Translation of 1 Chronicles, Job from English into Marathi
- The Shepherd of Salibury Plain - Translated into Marathi
- The Dairyman's Daughter - Translated into Marathi
- On Faith - Translated into Marathi
- Revised Translation of Kindness to Animals
- Physical Errors of Hinduism
- Scripture Manual - Translated into Marathi
