= Terri Wilder =

Terri Wilder may refer to:

- Terri L. Wilder, American social worker and AIDS activist
- Terri Hoffman, American religious cult leader, married to John Wilder
