= Playwrights' Center =

Non-profit theatre organization

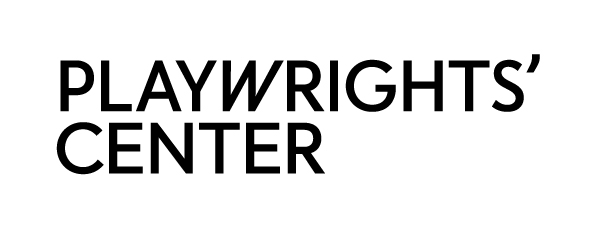

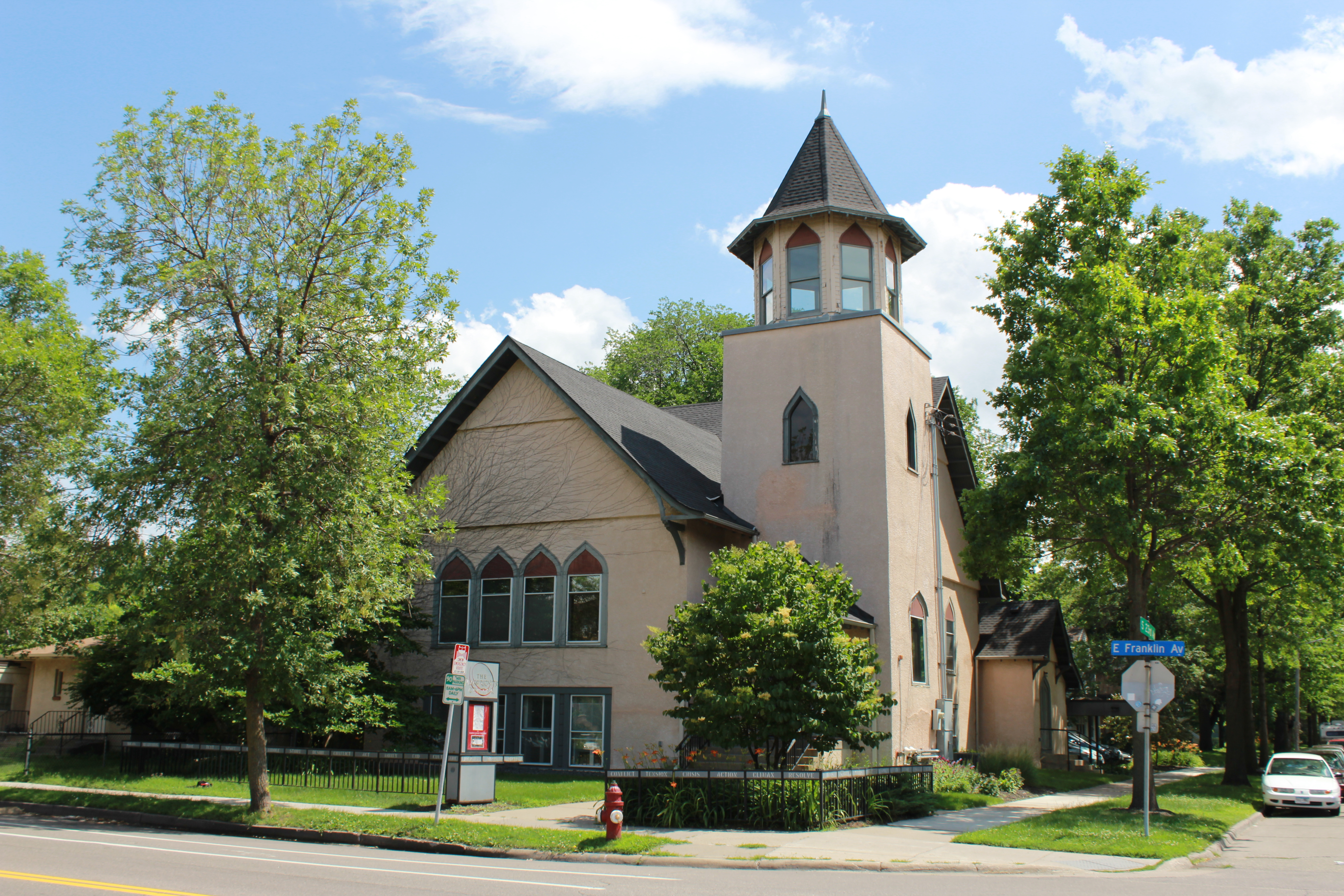
- Playwrights' Center in 2014
- Type: Non-profit
- Industry: Theatre
- Founded: 1971
- Headquarters: Minneapolis, Minnesota
- Number of employees: 13 (2012)
- Website: pwcenter.org

Playwrights' Center is a non-profit theatre organization focused on both supporting playwrights and promoting new plays to production at theaters. It is located in the St. Anthony Park neighborhood of St. Paul, Minnesota.

== History ==
Playwrights' Center was founded in 1971 by a group of University of Minnesota undergraduate and graduate students, including Greg Almquist, Erik Brogger, Tom Dunn, Barbara Field, Gar Hildenbrand, and Jon Jackoway. These playwrights conceived of the Playwrights' Center (initially called the Minnesota Playwriting Laboratory) as a place where writers could hear their work read aloud by professional actors, criticized from peers and audience members, and to develop their scripts collaboratively.

After becoming a not-for-profit company in 1973, the founders held a series of play readings, discussion series, and one-acts performed at various venues in the Twin Cities. In 1979, the center moved into the Olivet Lutheran Church in south Minneapolis. After many years in that location, the organization moved to its new space in September 2025.

Jeremy Cohen serves as the producing artistic director, and the center is further supported by a full staff, an eighteen-member board of directors and a national advisory board of theater professionals. Members of the Playwrights' Center include artists such as August Wilson, Lee Blessing, Ping Chong, Paula Vogel, Jeffrey Hatcher, Suzan-Lori Parks, Jordan Harrison, Carlyle Brown, Craig Lucas, Melanie Marnich, and Kira Obolensky.

Recent partners have included Tectonic Theater Project, Mixed Blood Theatre, Actors Theatre of Louisville, The Public Theater (NY), Oregon Shakespeare Festival, Ten Thousand Things Theater Company, Berkeley Rep, Marin Theatre Company, Seattle Repertory Theatre, and others. The Center also collaborates with local cultural institutions as the Walker Art Center and Minnesota History Center to develop theater that deepens their programming.

== Programs ==
=== The Ruth Easton Lab ===
The Ruth Easton New Play Series gives selected Core Writers 20 hours with collaborators to workshop their script. Each year, a handful of plays are selected from the Core Writers for development in The Ruth Easton Series. With funding from the Ruth Easton Lab, the plays receive a director, a designer and, if the playwright chooses, a free two public readings of the plays.

=== Core Writers ===
Each term is three years; Core Writers may re-apply for additional terms.

=== Core Apprentices ===
Schools participating in the New Plays on Campus program may nominate students to become Playwrights’ Center Core Apprentices. In partnership with the Kennedy Center American College Theater Festival, the Core Apprentice program provides student playwrights with a professional playwright and a workshop of a new play at the Playwrights’ Center. Five student playwrights are selected each year to be “Core Apprentices”.

=== PlayLabs ===
PlayLabs is an annual new play festival that occurs during a two-week span in October. Each playwright is paired with a director, designer, and cast of actors. The selected plays receive 30 hours of rehearsal and two readings with allocated writing and revision time. All readings are free. The festival extends to a Jerome Fellows showcase, a panel discussion, and a festival celebration. According to The Playwrights' Center 2005 annual report, 74 percent of Playlabs playwrights go on to receive professional productions or further development opportunities.

== Fellowships ==
=== Jerome Fellowships ===
- The Playwrights’ Center Jerome Fellowships are awarded annually, providing emerging American playwrights with funds and services. Four $16,000 fellowships will be awarded for 2015–16, in addition to $1,500 in development support. Fellows spend a year-long residency in Minnesota and have access to Playwrights' Center opportunities, including workshops with professional directors, dramaturgs, and actors.
- The Playwrights’ Center has awarded these fellowships in partnership with the Jerome Foundation since 1976: Lee Blessing, Lisa D’Amour, Naomi Iizuka, Melanie Marnich, Peter Sagal, Rhiana Yazzie, Janet Allard, and August Wilson. The 2014–2015 Jerome Fellows are Steve Moulds, Kate Tarker, Josh Wilder, and Deborah Yarchun.

=== Many Voices Fellowships ===
The Many Voices Fellowship was created in 1994 in partnership with the Jerome Foundation in order to create a home for early-career playwrights of color. Since that time, the Many Voices program has provided 140 fellowships for some 100 emerging playwrights of color, offering class instruction, play development workshops, and mentoring opportunities.

- Many Voices Fellowships are awarded annually to two artists of color. One fellowship is awarded to a Minnesota playwright, and one fellowship is awarded to either a Minnesota or national playwright. Recipients include Naomi Iizuka, Daniel Alexander Jones, Aditi Kapil, and Junauda Petrus. Many Voices Fellowships provide:
  - A $10,000 stipend
  - An additional $2,500 for living expenses
  - $1,500 in play development funds
  - Assistance in building connections with theater leaders and companies in the Twin Cities
- Many Voices Mentorships are awarded annually to two Minnesota-based beginning playwrights of color. Mentorships provide a $1,000 stipend as well as free access to a staged reading with professional actors, two six-week classes taught by playwriting professionals, an array of one-night seminars, a One-on-One with a Dramaturg session, and a two-year Playwrights' Center membership.

=== McKnight Fellowships ===
- McKnight Advancement Fellowships recognize playwrights whose work demonstrates "exceptional artistic merit" and whose primary residence is in the state of Minnesota.
- McKnight National Residency and Commission aids in the commissioning and development of new works by nationally recognized playwrights. Past recipients include: Kia Corthron, Kate Fodor, Daniel Alexander Jones, Sibyl Kempson, Craig Lucas, Dan O'Brien, Betty Shamieh, and Mac Wellman. The residency provides:
  - At least two U.S. round-trip airline tickets
  - A $14,000 commission
  - Housing during the residency period
  - Up to $5,750 in workshop funds
  - A public reading of the commissioned play
- McKnight Theater Artist Fellowships at the Playwrights' Center recognize theater artists other than playwrights whose work demonstrates "exceptional artistic merit and potential" and whose primary residence is in the state of Minnesota. It is a $25,000 fellowship. Recent recipients include Joel Sass, Michael Wangen, and Stephen Yoakam.
