= Wilders (surname) =

Wilders is a surname. Notable people with the surname include:

- Cor Wilders (1916–1998), Dutch footballer
- Geert Wilders (born 1963), Dutch politician
- Noel Wilders (born 1975), British boxer

== See also ==
- Wilder (surname)
