= Janet Allard =

American playwright and theatre educator

Janet Allard is an American playwright and theatre educator. Allard was born and raised in Hawaii. She currently teaches in the Theatre Department at the University of North Carolina at Greensboro. Allard's plays have been produced at The Guthrie Lab, The Kennedy Center, Mixed Blood Theatre Company, Playwrights Horizons, Yale Repertory Theatre, The Yale Cabaret, The Women's Project and Productions, Perseverance Theatre, The House Of Candles, and Access Theater in New York City, as well as internationally in Ireland, England, Greece, and New Zealand. She has twice been awarded a Jerome Fellowship by The Playwrights' Center in Minneapolis and has been a MacDowell Colony Fellow and a Fulbright Fellow (1998, New Zealand and the South Pacific).

Her plays and productions include Pool Boy, which premiered at Barrington Stage Company in 2010; Vrooommm!, which premiered at the Summer Play Festival in New York City in 2007 and was later produced by Triad Stage in Winston-Salem, NC in 2016; and Privates in Bill of (W)Rights at Mixed Blood Theatre in 2004. The Unknown: a silent musical was developed with P73 Productions, garnered an award from the Jonathan Larson Foundation, and was presented at Joe's Pub and the New York Musical Theater Festival in 2005.

== Publications ==
- Vrooommm! A NASComedy, Samuel French
- Incognito, Fashionistas, Speed Date, Untold Crimes of Insomniacs, Painted Rain, Loyal, Privates in Bill of (W)Rights, and A Christmas Carol, Playscripts.com.
- Shakespeare In Mind, Dramatic Publishing Company.
- My Mother#*^%#! College Life, Dramatic Publishing Company (in press 2017).
