= Peter Grant (pastor) =

Peter Grant.

Peter Grant (1783 – 1867) was a Scottish pastor, poet and songwriter. He was known as Pàdraig Grannd nan Oran ("Peter Grant of the Songs"), which became a household name in the Highlands of Scotland for nearly fifty years. His collection of hymns in Gaelic is called Dain Spioradail.

Grant formed what became the largest Baptist congregation in the Gaelic-speaking Highlands, and was at the forefront of evangelism in the area.

== Early life ==
Grant was born in Ballentua, Strathspey, Scotland, in 1783.

He was reared in a small-farming family but grew a considerable ministry as a Baptist pastor, poet, and songwriter.

"He was precentor in the parish church when the Haldane brothers were beginning to have an impact on Scotland."

== Ministry ==
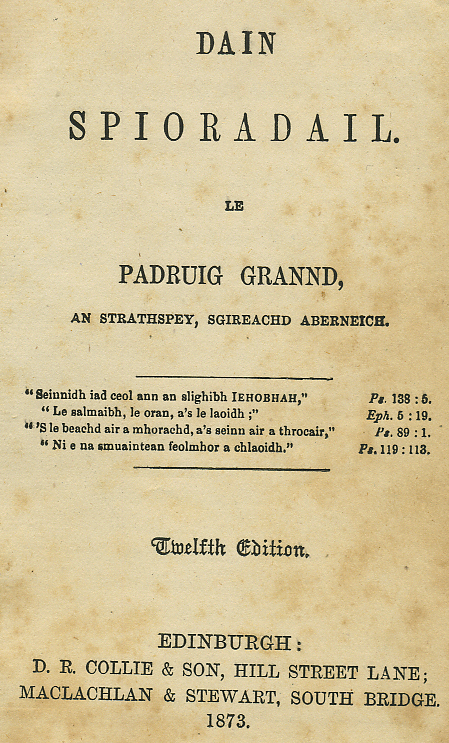
Dain Spioradail

Grant pastored the Baptist church at Grantown-on-Spey for 41 years.

His son William went on to pastor the same church for 39 years after him.

Scottish scholar Donald Meek states that:

"he was instrumental in forming what became the largest Baptist congregation in the Gaelic-speaking Highlands, but he was also at the forefront of itinerant evangelism throughout the area. His warm-hearted evangelical Calvinism found expression in powerful preaching, in Gaelic and/or English as appropriate...Peter Grant is best known to Highlanders and Islanders as the composer of many Gaelic hymns of evangelical experience which have remained popular to the present day."

== Works ==
Grant produced numerous hymns and sermons. In 2010 Terry Wilder in partnership with BorderStone Press, LLC released a volume entitled The Lost Sermons of Scottish Baptist Peter Grant, which Wilder transcribed and edited from Grant's original manuscripts. This represents the first time that the sermons of Peter Grant have been published.

Professor Michael D. McMullen stated that "We have relatively few extant records from the early life of Baptists in Scotland, and Wilder's carefully presented collection of Grant's writings makes a very valuable contribution to the little that is available. In this challenging volume, we have the powerful words of Peter Grant himself, some of which he preached to his people in the very midst of revival."

From the foreword by Scottish professor Donald Meek "Peter Grant, the poet, is thus well known, but Peter Grant, the preacher, is a relatively obscure figure, although his skills as an expositor have been remembered in Gaelic tradition, and his ability as a descriptive writer in English can be gauged from his reports to the Baptist Home Missionary Society. So far, however, we have not been privileged to sample the preaching style that proclaimed the Word of God, in both Gaelic and English, in the pulpit of Grantownon-Spey, and drew audiences from miles around. In this book, we are given a splendid opportunity to experience something of Peter Grant, the preacher, by means of his surviving sermons in English."

== Obituary ==
We announce in our obituary this week the death of the Rev. Peter Grant, Baptist Minister, Grantown, at the advanced age of 84. Mr. Grant was in many respects a remarkable man, and we regret that we have not materials in our possession to enable us to give anything like a worthy record of his life. He was descended from respectable ancestors in Strathspey, and succeeded his father as a farmer in the parish of Cromdale. Early in life, and we believe through the preaching of the Haldanes, his attention was directed to religious matters; and by-and-by he began to preach to others the Gospel which had brought so much comfort to himself. We have heard it stated as a curious coincidence that the favourite spot where he took his stand when preaching out of doors was a hollow in the west end of the village of Grantown, and upon that same spot the chapel now stands in which the flourishing congregation, of which Mr. Grant was

senior pastor, worships. Mr. Grant's preaching abilities were of a high order, and his ministrations were welcomed in many places between the two Craigellachies. With great knowledge of the Scriptures he combined a rich imagination and a ready utterance, and above all he preached the Gospel in all its fullness and clearness and simplicity at a time when evangelical preaching was much less common than it is now. By-and-by Mr. Grant was chosen pastor of the Baptist Church at Grantown, and he was spared to see the handful of people who then formed his charge increase under his own and his son's ministry to be a numerous and attached flock. Mr. Grant is widely known throughout Inverness-shire as the author of a volume of Gaelic hymns, which we have been informed by competent judges, are beyond comparison the best productions of the kind which have appeared in the Gaelic language. He also published, a good many years ago, a work in answer to a treatise on baptism by the late Rev. Mr. Munro, of Knockando, and proved himself a not unworthy antagonist of that skilful controversialist. Mr. Grant was a genial, warm-hearted, and truly devout man, and Christians of all denominations greatly respected him, and unite in lamenting his loss. He died at a good old age, and his exemplary, laborious, and most useful life will cause his memory to belong remembered and affectionately cherished in Strathsberg.—Elgin

Courier."
