= Joseph M. Wilder =

American politician

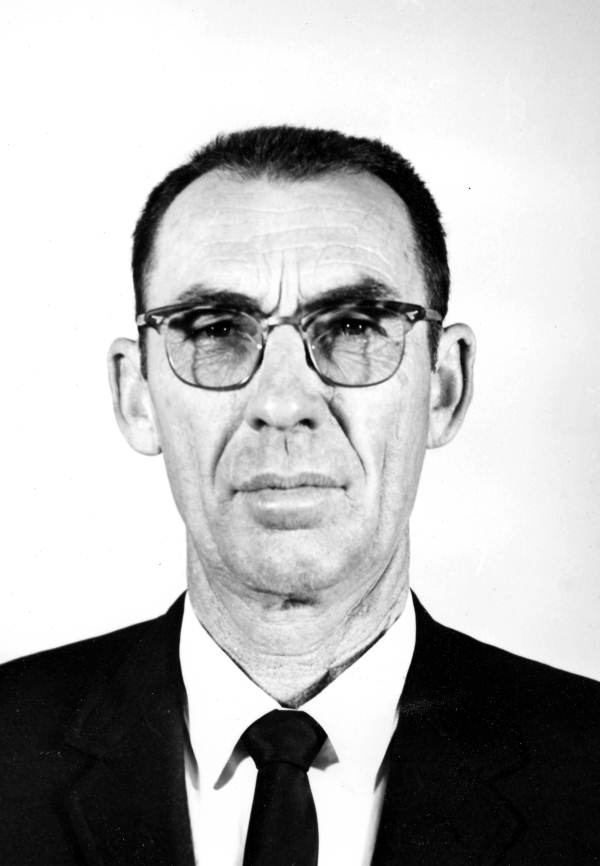
- Wilder in 1966

Member of the Florida House of Representatives from Levy County
- In office 1965–1966

Personal details
- Born: January 8, 1918 Bronson, Florida, U.S.
- Died: February 10, 1990 (aged 72)
- Party: Democratic

Joseph M. Wilder (January 8, 1918 – February 10, 1990) was an American politician. He served as a Democratic member of the Florida House of Representatives.

== Life and career ==
Wilder was born in Bronson, Florida. He was a motel manager.

Wilder served in the Florida House of Representatives from 1965 to 1966.

Wilder died on February 10, 1990, at the age of 72.
