= Terry Wilder =

Terry L. Wilder is an American biblical scholar, Professor of New Testament and Greek at Campbellsville University in Campbellsville, Kentucky. He previously served as Wesley Harrison Chair and Professor of New Testament at Southwestern Baptist Theological Seminary in Fort Worth, Texas, as Academic Acquisitions Editor for B&H Publishing Group in Nashville, Tennessee, and also as Professor of New Testament and Greek at Midwestern Baptist Theological Seminary in Kansas City, Missouri.

== Education ==
- Ph.D. - University of Aberdeen, Scotland
- M.Div.BL. - Southwestern Baptist Theological Seminary,
- M.A. - Dallas Baptist University

== Career ==
=== Contribution to Baptist Studies ===
In 2010 Wilder in partnership with BorderStone Press, LLC released a volume entitled The Lost Sermons of Scottish Baptist Peter Grant, which Wilder transcribed and edited from Grant's original manuscripts. This represents the first time that the sermons of Peter Grant, an 18th/19th Century Baptist pastor at Grantown Baptist Church, Grantown-on-Spey, Scotland, have been published. Grant formed what became the largest Baptist congregation in the Gaelic-speaking Highlands, and was at the forefront of evangelism in the area.

Professor Michael D. McMullen stated that "We have relatively few extant records from the early life of Baptists in Scotland, and Wilder’s carefully presented collection of Grant’s writings makes a very valuable contribution to the little that is available. In this challenging volume, we have the powerful words of Peter Grant himself, some of which he preached to his people in the very midst of revival."

From the foreword by Scottish professor Donald Meek "Peter Grant, the poet, is thus well known, but Peter Grant, the preacher, is a relatively obscure figure, although his skills as an expositor have been remembered in Gaelic tradition, and his ability as a descriptive writer in English can be gauged from his reports to the Baptist Home Missionary Society. So far, however, we have not been privileged to sample the preaching style that proclaimed the Word of God, in both Gaelic and English, in the pulpit of Grantownon-Spey, and drew audiences from miles around. In this book, we are given a splendid opportunity to experience something of Peter Grant, the preacher, by means of his surviving sermons in English."

=== Selected publications ===
- Wilder, Terry L. (2010). The Lost Sermons of Scottish Baptist Peter Grant: The Highland Herald. BorderStone Press, LLC. ISBN 978-0-9842284-9-2, afterword by Michael Haykin; foreword by Donald Meek.
- Wilder, Terry L.; Köstenberger, Andreas J., eds. (2010). Entrusted with the Gospel: Paul's Theology in the Pastoral Epistles. B&H Publishing Group. ISBN 978-0-8054-4841-2.
- Wilder, Terry L. (2017). "Hebrews, James". In Sean McDowell (ed.). CSB Apologetics Study Bible for Students. B&H Publishing Group. ISBN 978-1-4336-5118-2.
- Wilder, Terry L.; Charles, J. Daryl; Easley, Kendell H. (2007-09-01). Faithful to the End: An Introduction to Hebrews Through Revelation. B&H Publishing Group. ISBN 978-1-4336-6980-4.
- Wilder, Terry L. (2004). Pseudonymity, the New Testament, and Deception: An Inquiry Into Intention and Reception. University Press of America. ISBN 978-0-7618-2793-1.
