= Student Volunteer Movement =

US organization

The Student Volunteer Movement for Foreign Missions was an organization founded in 1886 that sought to recruit college and university students in the United States for missionary service abroad. It also sought to publicize and encourage the missionary enterprise in general. Arthur Tappan Pierson was the primary early leader.

== Origins and consolidation 1886–1891 ==
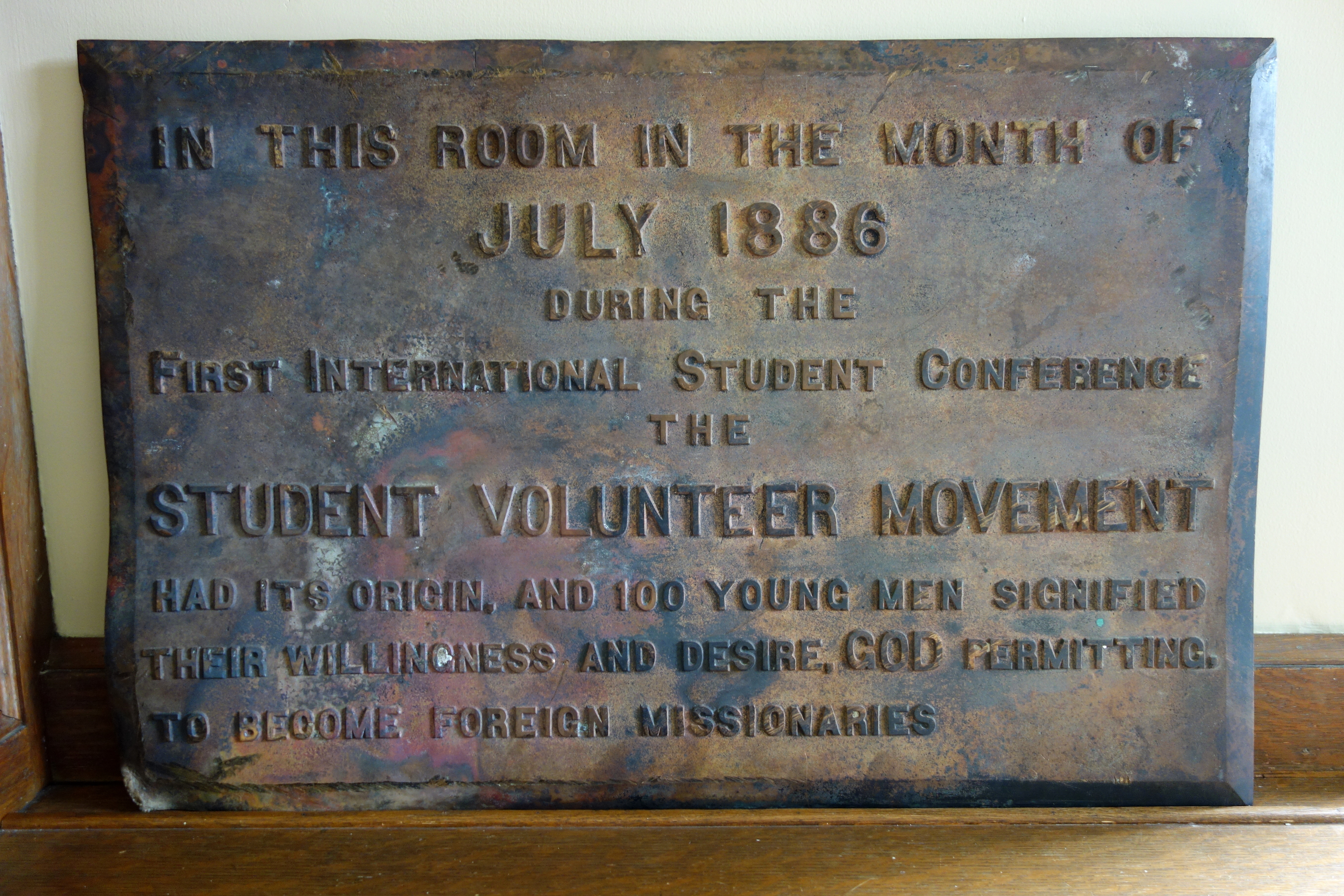
Memorial plaque for the origin of the Student Volunteer Movement, July 1886, Northfield Mount Hermon School

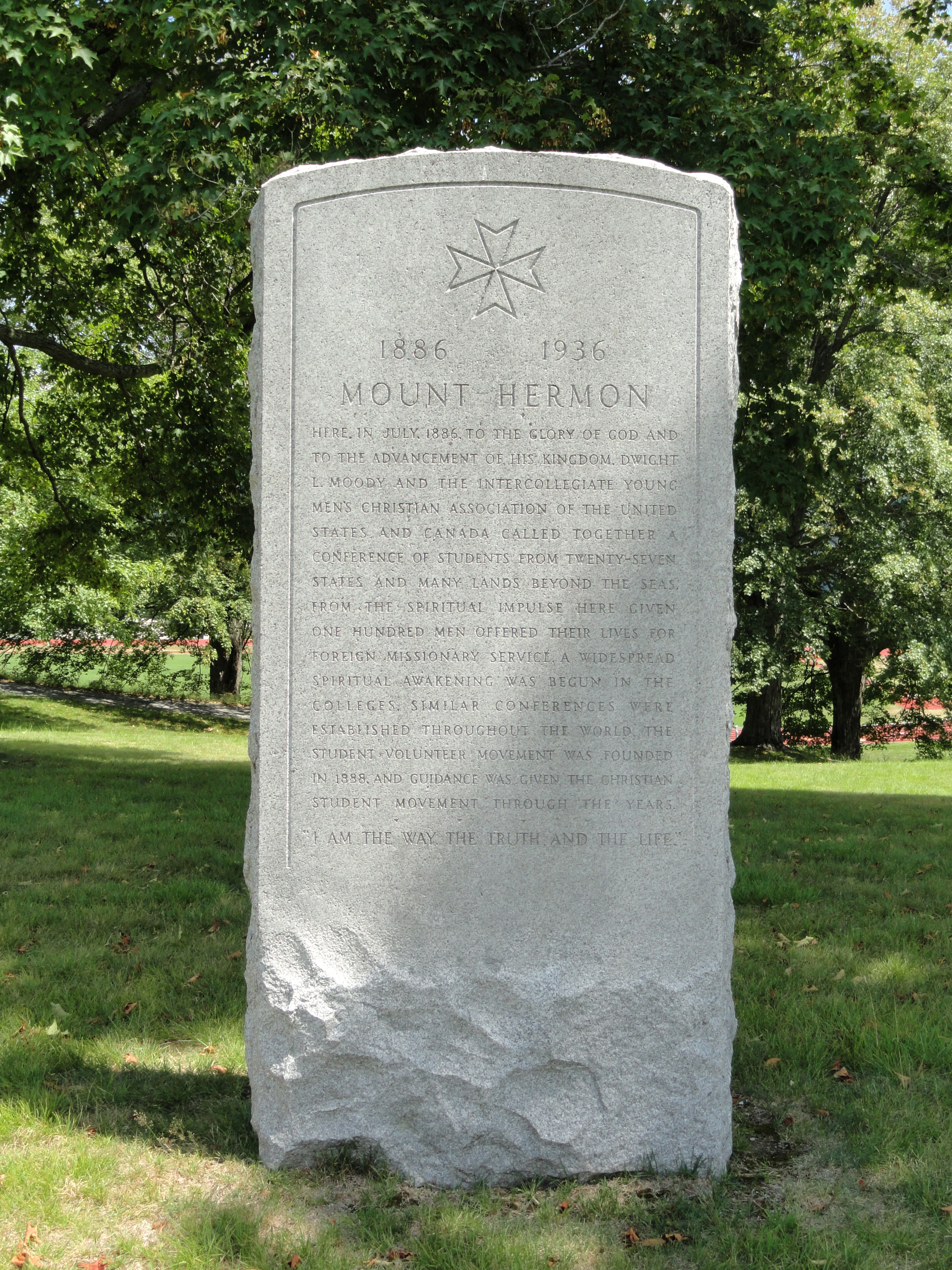
Conference memorial

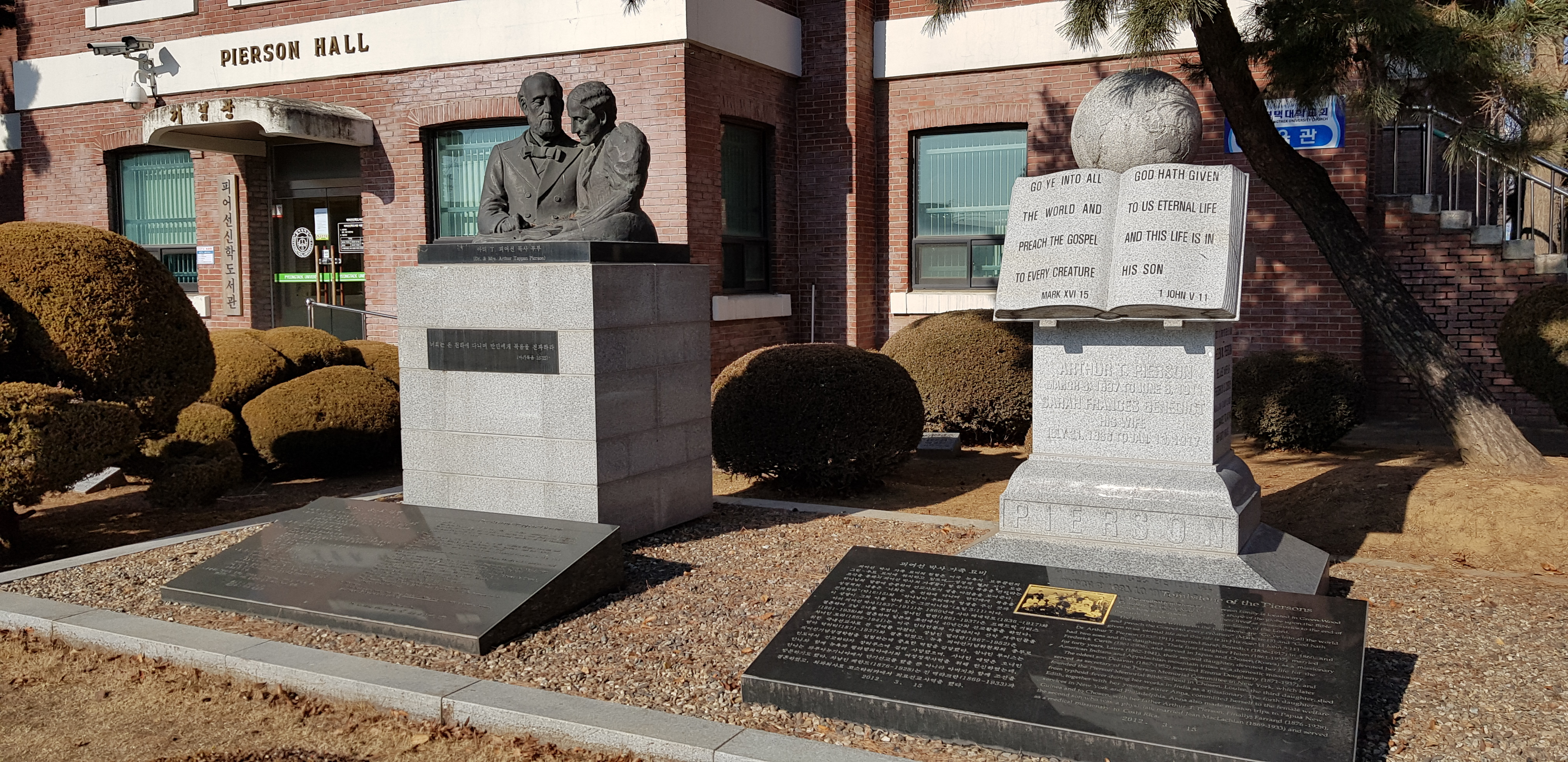
Arthur Tappan Pierson founder of SVM

The social and religious milieu of the late nineteenth century was favorable in nearly all ways for the birth and growth of a movement such as the Student Volunteer Movement for Foreign Missions. It was a time of dominance and prestige for Western civilization. Imperialistic expansion was condoned as an altruistic response to increased knowledge of the non-Western world. The rising nationalism of the era provided important motivation for the foreign missionary enterprise, for the success of American civilization was attributed to its Christian basis. Protestant foreign missionaries were heroes and heroines for the American public; and, as Robert Handy has noted, "Though they strove as Christians to keep the priority on spiritual religion and to be aware of the difference between faith and culture, it was not difficult in the spirit of those times to lose the distinction and to see Christian civilization as a main outcome of faith, if not its chief outcome." Historian of Christianity Kenneth Scott Latourette's comment that "one of the distinctive tokens of the Christianity and especially of the Protestantism of the United States was the fashion in which it conformed to the ethos of the country", was surely borne out in the early days of the Student Volunteer Movement. The spirit of pre-War American culture was one of expansionism and activism with an orientation toward business and enterprise. The extensive financial records and correspondence of the Volunteer Movement illustrate a congruence in style between business enterprise and the missions enterprise. American culture's shift toward scientific positivism during this era was reflected in the Student Volunteer Movement's emphasis on elaborate statistical evidence of its work.

Practical aspects of the late nineteenth and early twentieth century also contributed to the rapid growth of Protestant missions. Travel to far corners of the earth was possible as never before because of improved transportation and communication. The world scene was largely free from wars. It was a time of increasing Protestant wealth; Christian tycoons under attack for their enormous profits were more than happy to contribute large sums for the support of the foreign missionary enterprise.

With a perspective sharpened by knowledge of post-War events, historians of American religion have pointed to underlying conflicts and discrepancies which belied the idealistic confidence of the pre-War era. Economic turmoil, urbanization, the rise of historical criticism and evolutionary theory, the issue of liberalism versus revivalism—all these potentially disruptive elements lay beneath the assured facade of pre-War American Protestantism. Sydney Ahlstrom has attributed the foreign missions boom of the era to the churches' desire to avoid confrontation on these issues: "crusades of diverse sorts were organized, in part, it would seem, to heal or hide the disunity of the churches." Robert Handy has seen the mission enterprise as an extension of the voluntaryism of the 1830s—a means for cooperative Protestant action in society without confrontation on particular denominational differences. Handy, like Ahlstrom, has pointed to the dangers which were inherent in sublimation of theological and social controversy under activist crusades: "The possibility of a greater sense of self-criticism, which might have come out of a more open confrontation of the parties, was largely suppressed, in considerable measure because of the necessities of the missionary consensus. .

This, then, was the milieu into which the Student Volunteer Movement for Foreign Missions was born in July 1886. Its emergence at a summer student conference held on the campus of the Mount Hermon School in Northfield, Massachusetts had all the drama of a theatrical play, and its story was told countless times over the decades of the Movement's existence. The drama of the scene will not be destroyed, however, by consideration of the historical antecedents of the Movement.

In his work, Two Centuries of Student Christian Movements, Clarence Shedd traced the existence of student Christian societies back to the early years of the eighteenth century. By the beginning of the nineteenth century, he found, a foreign missions emphasis was prevalent in the student societies and fully three-quarters of them were called Societies of Missionary Inquiry. In 1877, a student department of YMCA was formed to direct efforts more specifically toward Christian work on college and university campuses. Luther D. Wishard, the first collegiate secretary of the YMCA, had a great personal interest in foreign missions, and his influence did much to orient the student YMCA in that direction. On the theological seminary scene, efforts were underway by 1879 to form "some permanent system of inter-seminary correspondence on the subject of missions." To this end, the Inter-Seminary Missionary Alliance was established in 1880 and had annual conventions until 1898 when its work was merged with that of the Student Volunteer Movement and intercollegiate YMCA.

The first, unofficial, group of student volunteers for foreign missions was formed in 1888 at Princeton College. Five students, including Robert P. Wilder, drew up and signed a declaration of purpose which read, "We, the undersigned, declare ourselves willing and desirous, God permitting, to go to the unevangelized portions of the world." Calling themselves the Princeton Foreign Missionary Society, these students met regularly on Sunday afternoons at the home of Robert Wilder's father who was a former missionary to India and currently editor of The Missionary Review.

In 1885, Luther Wishard discussed with evangelist Dwight L. Moody the possibility of holding a Bible study conference for undergraduate students, sponsored by the intercollegiate YMCA, on the grounds of the Moody-backed Mount Hermon School. Moody agreed to the proposal, and in July 1886 two hundred and fifty-one students from eighty-nine colleges and universities met together for nearly a month. Although Robert Wilder had graduated from Princeton in 1885, and was no longer an undergraduate student, Luther Wishard, knowing of Wilder's missionary interests, specifically invited him to the Northfield conference.

The Northfield conference was designed to provide for Bible study, evangelistic addresses, and discussion of methods for YMCA college work. Although several of the 251 delegates had come to Northfield already committed to a missionary vocation, missions were scarcely mentioned from the platform during the first two weeks of the conference. Those interested in missions met daily for prayer, led by Robert Wilder, and spread their concern for missions by word of mouth among the delegates. Two missionary addresses were given outside of the conferences formal program, the first by Arthur Tappan Pierson and the second by William Ashmore, an American Baptist missionary to China. Twenty-five years later John R. Mott waxed eloquent in reminiscing about the impact of Dr. Ashmore's address on the students at Northfield:

He knew how to get hold of college men. I will tell you the way to do it, and that is to place something before them which is tremendously difficult. He presented missions as a war of conquest and not as a mere wrecking expedition. It appealed to the strong college athletes and other fine spirits of the colleges because of its difficulty. They wanted to hear more about it. The number of interviews greatly multiplied.

The underground swell of missionary enthusiasm grew daily, and at last the subject of missions was introduced on the formal platform of the conference in the form of a "meeting of ten nations". Ten men, some foreign students and others missionary sons, were found to speak of the mission needs of the lands of their birth. Those who listened were deeply impressed, and by the last day of the Northfield conference ninety-nine students had signed a paper which read: "We are willing and desirous, God permitting, to become foreign missionaries." The morning after the closing of the conference the ninety-nine volunteers met for a farewell service, and while they prayed one more came in to join their ranks.

In the succeeding days it was decided to form a deputation of volunteers to visit colleges across North America in an attempt to extend the influences of the Northfield missionary uprising. The model for this deputation was the "Cambridge Seven", a group of prominent British university students who had decided to become missionaries to China following the evangelistic crusade of Dwight Moody at Cambridge University in 1884. Members of the "Cambridge Seven" traveling throughout Britain and the United States had had considerable impact on various campuses.

The four volunteers chosen to form the Northfield deputation were Robert Wilder, John R. Mott, William P. Taylor, and L. Riley of Princeton, Cornell, DePauw, and Yale. The original scheme was that these four would not only speak about missions but would also form a Quartet and sing mission songs. The deputation fell apart before it got started, however, as, within the next two months, Mott, Riley and Taylor decided that it was not God's will for them to travel during the next academic year. Worried letters were exchanged between Robert Wilder and the two YMCA intercollegiate secretaries – Luther Wishard and Charles K. Ober. It was feared that the momentum of Northfield would be lost due to the recalcitrance of the three who had pulled out. Wishard wrote to Ober on August 19, 1886 regarding Mott's withdrawal: "The tone of his letter did not suit me. He seemed disposed to see the Lord's hand in his detention without indicating a single reason aside from his parents' opposition for not going. I told him the fact of God's interest in the enterprise did not absolutely insure success as his letter would imply."

At last the problem was solved as John Forman, who had not been at Northfield but was one of the original five volunteers at Princeton, to accompany Wilder on his tour of North American college and university campuses during the academic year 1886–1887. One hundred and sixty-seven institutions were visited, and by the end of the year 2200 young men and women had declared their purpose to become foreign missionaries. In later years the work of Wilder and Forman was severely criticized for its highly pressured emotionalism. The Catholic periodical America published a description of early volunteer recruitment which undoubtedly had some basis in fact:

The manner in which these young People were won over is remarkably American. According to Warneck, even moral violence was used. Three, four, five meetings were held in succession, the one more emotional than the other. At some of them even the lights were extinguished, while all lay prostrate upon the floor in prayer. More and more urgent appeals were addressed to the young men, then already in a state of great excitement, until finally, one, two, then three and more, of the artfully intoxicated students volunteered.

During the academic year 1887/1888 there were no deputations to campuses, as Wilder and Forman chose to commence their theological training. The earlier visits had continuing impact, however, as local bands of volunteers were formed and six hundred further declarations of purpose were received. The offices of the volunteer movement during these earliest years were the dormitory room of William Hannum, a student at Union Theological Seminary in New York City. As Wilder and others visited campuses and churches and obtained names and addresses of students who wished to volunteer, Hannum made lists of volunteers and attempted to correspond with them. The records of volunteers were kept in envelopes in boxes under Hannum's bed. As they proliferated, Hannum called upon his fellow students for help. He later wrote "I almost felt that my demands for help were a hazard to my popularity. One classmate asserted that when I got to Heaven I should be making lists of the angels."

By July 1888, at YMCA student conference at Northfield, it seemed clear to interested parties that the student missionary thrust needed some organization. Much of the original zeal had subsided, and "where it still survived it displayed itself in new organizations, tending to separate from the existing religious societies of the colleges and sometimes at discordance with them. (Robert E. Speer, "The Students' Volunteer Missionary Movement".) The travels of Wilder and Forman had been completely financed by D.W. McWilliams, secretary and treasurer of the Manhattan Elevated Railways Co., but it was clear that the movement needed a broader financial base in order to continue.

In the summer of 1888 the volunteer movement adopted as its official name the Student Volunteer Movement for Foreign Missions and took as its slogan or watchword "the evangelization of the world in this generation." Questions regarding the relation of the student volunteers to existing student Christian groups, particularly YMCA and YWCA, had been in the air since the fall of 1886. On September 7, 1886 Luther Wishard had written to C.K. Ober regarding the nascent volunteer movement: "It will not do to have a distinct organization for this purpose. Colleges are becoming overrun with organizations now." It was clear that the general aims of the Volunteer Movement were in agreement with those of YMCA but the SVM had a wider constituency, including women and graduate students, as well as a more specialized focus. In August 1888, when plans were made for Robert Wilder to again tour the North American campuses for the SVM, Luther Wishard expressed reservations to a fellow YMCA secretary:

"Unless Wilder is perfectly willing to cooperate with our views concerning the connection of the missionary with the regular association work, I am seriously disposed to deflect his course into another channel. You know that we had little or no influence over him year before last. He talked Mission Band all year and never to my knowledge did he try to retain the work in the Association and never did he try to aid any other department of the Association work. As a result of his method the College Associations are conducting fewer missionary meetings."

Wishard, Wilder, Mott, and other leaders of the volunteer movement sought a solution to this conflict of interests in early 1889 proposing that the Student Volunteer Movement be designated as the official missionary arm of YMCA and YWCA. They formed an Executive Committee of the Movement with one representative each from YMCA, the YWCA and the Inter-Seminary Missionary Alliance. A traveling secretary, a recording secretary and a corresponding secretary were appointed to carry on the daily work of the Movement. They concentrated their efforts on spreading missionary enthusiasm and bringing local and state volunteer organizations under the influence of the national Movement.

The work of the early years culminated in the First International (i.e., including Canada) Convention of the Student Volunteer Movement, meeting in Cleveland in 1891. This convention, with its keynote The evangelization of the world in this generation", was the largest student conference assembled to its time. The Executive Committee reported to the convention that 6,200 volunteers in 350 institutions had been enrolled and 320 had actually sailed to foreign fields under appointment of various mission boards. At Cleveland, the relationship of the SVM to the Protestant foreign missions boards was clarified to the effect that the Movement was in no way a sending agency but rather viewed itself as a recruiting agency for the boards.

Thus, by 1891, the Student Volunteer Movement was on firm footing and appeared to have found a clear space for operating in the American religious scene. Its relation to other established student Christian movements was that of an autonomous but associated agency with the clearly defined objectives of foreign mission education and recruitment. As a missionary organization, the Movement was assured a place within American Protestantism, for, as missions historian Charles Forman has written, "In the new enthusiasm following 1890 mission work was seen by its interpreters as the essential work of the church; no church could be healthy without it."

== Continued growth ==
The years of steady growth following 1891 were not without their problems. In its report to the Second International Convention, held in Detroit in 1894, the Executive Committee pointed to five "problems" and five "perils" for the Student Volunteer Movement. The problems were: 1) lack of supervision and control over local volunteer bands, 2) inability to keep in touch with isolated volunteers, particularly those who had graduated but had not yet sailed, 3) difficulty in holding volunteers after they had entered theological seminary; "from the beginning to the end of the course the whole presumption in the teaching and attitude of the faculty is that the men are all going to stay home" 4) difficulties in connecting volunteers up with mission societies and 5) financial obstacles. by 1894, 630 volunteers had sailed but others had been held back because the mission societies did not have sufficient funds to send them.

The Executive Committee cited two "perils" which related to the Student Volunteer Movement declaration of purpose card, a 3" by 5" card which a volunteer signed to indicate his or her intention to become a foreign missionary. In the summer of 1892, the original phrase for referring to these cards, the "volunteer pledge", had been replaced by the phrase "volunteer declaration". The wording of the card had been changed to read: "It is my purpose, if God permit, to become a foreign missionary." These changes were made to counter the criticism that the card was a binding pledge which caused the volunteer to take his life into his own control rather than relying on the guidance of the Holy Spirit. Charges of pressured emotionalism led to the Executive Committees caution that the declaration card not be used at the wrong time, in the wrong place or under wrong circumstances. The Executive Committee had included in its 1891 report statistics to counter the particular charge that students were being pressured at so young an age that they could not make competent decisions. Only 14 percent of enrolled volunteers at that time were under twenty years of age.

A third peril seen by the Executive Committee in 1894 was that of exaggerating the results of the Movement. Thousands had signed the SVM declaration card but then had no continued contact with the Movement. The Executive Committee decided not to count as members of the Movement those of whom it could obtain no trace. By this policy, the official membership of the Movement was cut drastically from a supposed 6200 volunteers in 1891 to 3200 volunteers in 1894. A fourth peril concerned the growing class of volunteers classified as "hindered", those who had signed the declaration of purpose but now showed little likelihood of making it to the foreign field because of health, family or financial reasons.

The fifth peril brought to the attention of the Convention by the Executive Committee was one which proved to be a nemesis for the SVM throughout its existence. There was a tendency for a breach to form between student volunteers and religiously oriented non-volunteers on college campuses. The volunteers were accused of taking on a tone of superiority and segregating themselves from the general religious associations. Nearly a decade later, Robert Speer again reported to the Executive Committee: "I have found an apparent chasm between the volunteers and the rest of the students in the institution. The Volunteer Band is a little circle cut off from the students and often without a bond of sympathy between it and the students."

The Student Volunteer Movement's early method of presenting the missionary cause through "fact meetings", statistical presentations of the needs of various fields, gave way during this period to missions study classes. An Educational Department was formed in 1894, and introduced its first four courses of study: "The Historical Development of the Missionary Idea", "South America", "Medical Missions", and "China as a Mission Field." Increasing emphasis was placed on forming missionary libraries on campuses.

During the early years of the Movement emphasis had been placed on recruiting young men as volunteers. The traveling secretaries were men, and they had not generally visited women's institutions. The proportion of women accessible in colleges was also much smaller than the proportion of men. By 1892, seventy percent of declared volunteers were men and thirty percent were women although in the general American missionary movement women outnumbered men. In 1895, steps were taken to rectify this situation, including increased visitation of women's colleges.

No major rival movements had as yet arisen to compete for the student religious territory claimed by the SVM although potential rivals apparently existed, as mentioned in the correspondence of 1895:

I do not fear anything of much account from the 'Order of the Double Cross' which originated with Dr. Dowkontt. It cannot hold its constituency together even were it to become fairly organized on any considerable scale. It will doubtless soon die out as other side movements have. At its very best it would not be of much power or a serious menace to our work. Still it is well to keep a watch on it and this we shall constantly do. Later, at a 1904 leaders' conference, a word of caution was again raised; "We must remember an undertone that the Student Volunteer Movement has a monopoly and there is talk of a new movement." The initial fervor of the Student Volunteer Movement cause had swept aside questions regarding specific theological stances but as the Movement became more deeply involved in missionary education work, criticisms inevitably arose. Educational Secretary Harlan P. Beach wrote to John R. Mott in June 1896 regarding criticisms of the Movement's course of study dealing with non-Christian religions. The views of the author, it was charged, were "tinctured with the Parliament of Religions flavor" but Beach maintained that they were not nearly so liberal as that.

In the view of the Volunteer Movement leaders, the entire Protestant missions enterprise seemed to be sagging in the last years of the nineteenth century. Harlan Beach wrote to Mott in 1896: "Sometimes it seems as if the missionary spirit of the churches had received a permanent setback. The panic is far enough in the background now to have lost its power. No immediate prospect of better times is to be seen. What then can be done?" Increasingly, the Movement's task was not only to recruit missionaries but also, through educational methods, to encourage financial support of the mission boards. There were far more recruits than positions to be filled but the SVM justified its continued recruiting activity on the grounds that a wider pool for the boards to select from would result in more highly qualified missionaries.

Despite these negative notes, the Student Volunteer Movement grew steadily during the pre-War era. Regular Quadrennial Conventions were held in 1898 (Cleveland), 1902 (Toronto), 1906 (Nashville), 1910 (Rochester) and 1914 (Kansas City). Convention speakers included such prominent individuals as former Secretary of State John W. Foster, Ambassador of Great Britain in the United States Henry Mortimer Durand and James Bryce. By 1910, 4338 volunteers had sailed to foreign fields. Slightly over fifty percent of all missionaries who sailed from America in the years 1906 to 1909 were student volunteers. The activities of the SVM also had spinoff effects including the formation of the Laymen's Missionary Movement in 1906 and the establishment of home mission projects such as the Yale Hope Mission.

The identification of the work of the Volunteer Movement with the ethos of American society during this period was expressed clearly by the religious periodical The Outlook in its comments on the 1906 Nashville convention:

The confidence which, directed to one end, gives security to commerce was at Nashville a faith in the ultimate worldwide prevalence of the influence and principles of Christ. Ambition, which drives some men into constructing great industries, was there the impulse to have a part in bringing that dominion to pass; and devotion to a purpose, which is the secret of success in commercial enterprise, was there manifest in the determination of those four thousand delegates thus expressed to make known to all the world "in this generation" the Good News.

== Facing a new era ==
The First World War led to a drop in recruitment of new volunteers, but the months immediately following the armistice brought a phenomenal increase in new missionaries sent overseas. The peak year for enlistment of new volunteers was 1921. The high idealism of the war years still reigned, and mission work seemed to fit clearly with hopeful expectations for international democracy. The Interchurch World Movement symbolized the crusading idealism of the times with its aim of gathering all American benevolent and missionary societies into a grand campaign for the spread of Christianity. The devastating collapse of the Interchurch World Movement due to lack of financial support shocked American Protestant leaders into the realization that a new era had arrived. With the "return to normalcy", post-War economic disruption and an altered psychological mood, there was a rapid descent into what Robert Handy has called the "American religious depression" of 1925 to 1935. This religious depression, in force well before the great economic depression of the era, was grounded in the realization that American Protestantism could no longer identify itself with American culture and civilization.

The fortunes of the Student Volunteer Movement during this period provide vivid illustration of the general trends in American Protestantism. Even while missionary enthusiasm was peaking and declaration cards were pouring in, winds of dissent were buffeting the Des Moines convention of 1919/1920. As Robert Handy has described the scene, the patriarch of the Movement, John R. Mott, opened the convention with an address similar in tone to those of previous conventions. When Sherwood Eddy took the same tack, some of the students disclosed their feelings to him frankly, saying "why do you bring us this piffle, these old shibboleths, these old worn-out phrases, why are you talking to us about the living God and the divine Christ?" Eddy thereupon threw aside his prepared second address and spoke instead in support of the League of Nations and social reform, before returning again to spiritual reform.

The old Student Volunteer Movement evangelicalism no longer had the same appeal for the post-War generation of students. Proof seemed forthcoming that the surging missionary enterprise of American Protestantism's halcyon days had been in part a shield against potential controversy. When its momentum broke, several major problems arose for the Student Volunteer Movement and refused to be subdued.

The overarching difficulty was that of a widening conservative/ liberal rift whose roots extending back to the founding of the Volunteer Movement. The early focus of debate had been the Movement's watchword, "the evangelization of the world in this generation." Arthur T. Pierson, who had first used the watchword at Northfield, was a renowned conservative premillenarianist. The impression became widespread that the watchword implied a rapid, simplistic, verbal presentation of Christ to the world which would fulfill the Biblical command and bring about the Second Coming. Though Pierson himself denied this meaning and other SVM leaders, such as Mott and Speer, repeatedly urged a broader interpretation which involved church planting and educational work, the watchword remained a center of controversy. For the missionary enterprise, the Fundamentalist–Modernist Controversy was framed in terms of the relative merits of an emphasis on individual evangelism and salvation or a broader, social impact on foreign culture based on the tenets of Christianity. Sherwood Eddy wrote in July 1922 to the Executive Committee:"I believe that the demand of the progressive students at Des Moines voiced the new sentiment in the colleges for a more socialized and broader presentation and conduct of our whole movement ... . The next Convention might well spend several days in making indelibly clear the Pagan racial practice both at home and abroad, the Pagan industrial situation here and in other lands, Pagan nationalism at home and abroad, and against such a background make clear the vital need for Christ's teachings and for Christ's power if the world is to be Christianized.

The growing skepticism, even pessimism, about Western civilization led American students to view foreign missions and home missions as equally important parts of the same task. It seemed clear that American society was as much in need of Christianizing as many non-Western societies. At the same time non-Western countries were beginning to doubt whether anything of value could be derived from a civilization capable of producing the horrors of World War I. Rising nationalism abroad brought distrust of the motives and methods of foreign missionaries.

These broad changes led to a distinct shift in Protestant mission theory. At first evangelization of the world had meant exportation of a Christian Western civilization. Now that Western civilization was questioned and viewed as itself un-Christian, there was increased appreciation for non-Western cultures and a conviction that Western missionary activity should find its role in support, not control, of the emerging indigenous churches. The new rationale for missionary activity was one which Charles Forman has called "ecumenical sharing."

Liberal missiology of the between-War period, as represented by Daniel Fleming, Archibald Baker, Oscar Buck, and others, was characterized by a cultural relativism with regard to religions. This relativism was bolstered by a cynical wave of negative publicity about missions work in the public press. A culmination of these liberal views was reached in the 1932 report of the Laymen's Foreign Missions Inquiry, a Rockefeller-funded body established to review the work of the American Protestant missionary enterprise. The group, led by Harvard professor William E. Hocking, concluded that missionaries should not stress the distinct claims of Christianity over against non-Christian religions. The aim of missions should be to cooperate for social improvement.

In addition, the rising student generation was demanding more say in the operations and policy of the Movement. Despite organizational changes, a student writing after the 1924 convention in Indianapolis complained about the restraining hand of the "Big Four" (Speer, Mott, Eddy and Wilder) and insisted that the new numerical majority of students in committees meant little because the adults still had the power. Another continuing problem was the relationship of the Student Volunteer Movement to YMCA and YWCA. A third problem concerned the role of "colored" students in the SVM. Decreasing financial support exacerbated these problems even before the Depression.

As problems accumulated, Movement leaders called for radical changes. In a December 1923 John L. Childs questioned the value of the Movement, pointing to ways in which the missionary situation had evolved past it. He suggested elimination of the declaration card on the grounds that "modern missionary activity has become so complex that merely to decide to become a foreign missionary is a step of doubtful value in determining what one shall do with his life."

The adult and student leaders of the SVM proposed and put into action remedies for many of the less fundamental problems facing the Movement. They instituted an increasingly democratic system of policy formation (as detailed in the description of Series V below). They changed the formats of the conventions to allow more student participation. They discussed numerous possibilities for relating the Movement to the general Christian associations and attempted to increase the Movement's cooperation with home missions agencies. To avert criticism of the declaration card, the secretaries of the Movement urged that the cards be distributed with great reserve and only in conjunction with explanatory material. Committees set up to deal with the problems of "colored" students recommended that "colored" institutions be added to the routes of traveling secretaries and that the missions boards be encouraged to reevaluate their restrictions on sending Negro missionaries abroad. On the financial scene, efforts were again made to establish a wider basis of financial support rather than relying so heavily on a few wealthy contributors.

== Conservative and liberal confusion ==
Remedies for the philosophical questions confronting the Movement were not so easy to propose. The leadership of the Movement was clearly divided on the important issues. Special commissions established in 1925 and 1933 to evaluate the policies of the SVM came to some conclusions but did not solve any problems. It became increasingly difficult for the Movement to maintain its original blend of conservative and liberal elements in a time when conservatism and liberalism were rapidly drifting apart.

Executive Committee member E. Fay Campbell wrote to General Secretary Robert Wilder in 1925 expressing the fear that the Student Volunteer Movement was tending to become a conservative general Christian movement, a rival to YMCA and YWCA on the conservative end of the spectrum. Wilder replied: "I may be wrong, but I believe that there is more danger of our Movement's losing conservative Volunteers than-liberal Volunteers. In two conservative institutions the Volunteers voted separation from the SVM on the ground that we are too liberal theologically." Wilder's concluding plea that theological controversy be avoided in Movement work reflected the failure of the SVM leadership to comprehend the inevitability of liberal /conservative conflict in the changing religious scene.

The correspondence and documents of the Student Volunteer Movement from this period of its history seem to point to a three layer, conservative/liberal/conservative distribution in the hierarchy of the organization. At the highest echelons of authority men like General Secretary Wilder and his chosen successor, Jesse R. Wilson, as well as various members of the Executive Committee, held to a basically conservative outlook throughout the period. They consistently called for deeper spiritual power in the Movement and emphasized the need for personal evangelical faith. In 1933 the Commission on Student Volunteer Movement Policy submitted a report which among other things questioned the entire "reservoir system" of missionary recruitment upon which the SVM was based. An interesting exchange of correspondence between two Commission members suggests that the higher echelons deliberately chose to disregard the proposals offered by the Commission:

"There is an obvious shelving of the evidence. To my mind that pamphlet is nothing short of an unintended but actual betrayal of trust to those who supplied facts and got only one man's opinion in return, or the opinion of his group. My real concern is not for the SVM but for the future of Mr. Wilson. I truly believe that unless he makes a complete turn in his methods of operation, he will be shelved by those demanding a larger vision than exists in the SVM at present."

By 1935 Jesse Wilson was considering resigning from the General Secretaryship. A letter from his friend E. Fay Campbell again suggests the extent to which the Movement was wracked by conservative/liberal dissension: "Your years as SVM secretary have been terribly hard due to the spirit of the times, R.P. Wilder's ineffective leadership and the situation in the General YMCA-YWCA. It was inevitable that your name and the name of the SVM should be identified with outworn ideas. I know it wasn't true that you didn't believe in social religion, but I also know that the fight for missions has antagonized certain People. You know I have talked on this point many times in YMCA group when you were accused of being only a personal gospel person."

Below the sphere of Wilder and Wilson there appears to have been a liberal contingent in the SVM which included educational secretaries and traveling secretaries as well as the most articulate and active portion of the actual student volunteers. The existence of this contingent explains the fact that many of the publications and convention themes of the period were rather far to the liberal side of the theological and missiological spectrum despite the SVM's leaders' conservative reputations. Many evidences of a liberal orientation in the Movement could be cited. Liberal missiologists Daniel Fleming and Oscar Buck were among those invited to speak at the 1924 Indianapolis convention. Fleming's book, Contacts with Non-Christian Cultures, was given a very laudatory review by SVM educational secretary Milton Stauffer in the October 1923 issue of Intercollegian. The 1930 issue of the SVM periodical Far Horizons were centered around the primarily social rather than personal gospel themes of l)How do foreign missions meet human suffering?; 2) How do foreign missions create world solidarity? and 3) How do foreign missions fill the hunger of men?

The liberal drift of the Student Volunteer Movement was accentuated by the gradual withdrawal of conservative elements from the Movement. By 1925, at least three local Volunteer Bands had disassociated themselves from the national Movement, groups which E. Fay Campbell dismissed as uncooperative "controversial fundamentalists." In 1928, when the Moody Bible Institute withdrew its support of the Movement, Campbell was a bit more concerned: "We need their point of view decidedly; in fact it would be nothing short of a major tragedy if they were to pull out of the Movement now and take with them some of our more conservative groups."

Campbell's cause for concern was real. Examination of the denominational preferences of sailed volunteers for the years 1910 to 1930 reveals that while in the earlier years the vast majority of the volunteers had sailed under appointment to mainline denominational boards, as the Movement progressed through the 1920s an increasing proportion of its volunteers were sailing under faith mission boards. This trend in the Student Volunteer Movement reflected a similar tendency in the general missionary movement. The Movement now found itself in danger of losing the support of the conservative core which was supplying an increasing proportion of its volunteers.

Faith mission boards, so-called because of their methods of securing personnel and financial support, had long been part of the American missions scene. One of the earliest, the China Inland Mission, had been established in 1865. These mission boards, generally characterized by theological conservatism, had participated wholeheartedly in the early years of the Student Volunteer Movement, though their programs were not nearly so large as those of the mainline denominations. As the gap between conservative and liberal missions theory opened and grew in the years following World War I, the Volunteer Movement found itself increasingly unable to cater simultaneously to the interests of the faith mission boards and the more liberal denominational boards.

As the 1930s approached, a growing proportion of missionaries going overseas were supported by faith mission boards. Reasons for this have been suggested by conservative missions historian Harold Lindsell: "Liberalism has never been noted for its missionary zeal. The inroads of scientist, behaviorism, and humanism may well have been the consequence of an uncertain theological note which carried no impelling conviction of the Gospel imperative for those without Christ." The theology of the faith missions, on the other hand, has had a compelling motivation for missions, asserting that no person can be saved from eternal damnation except through hearing and believing the Gospel of Jesus Christ.

The expanding faith missions were not inclined toward ecumenical cooperation. They increasingly drew away from the SVM, draining off financial support as well as potential volunteers. In 1934, General Secretary Jesse Wilson reported to the SVM General Council that "Many friends, rightly or wrongly, have questioned the soundness, from an evangelical point of view, of the Movement's present position and have preferred to make their contributions to organizations concerning which no such questions have arisen." A direct rival to the Student Volunteer Movement's work was growing in the conservative wings during this period, although not emerging officially in the United States until 1940 as the InterVarsity Christian Fellowship. In 1934, a year after the conservative Intervarsity Missionary Fellowship had been formed in Britain, E. Fay Campbell characterized the Volunteer Movement's position as follows:

The SV groups in the US and Canada are in close contact with certain Christian groups which are not being reached very effectively by the General Movements...(but) I do want to remind you that there is a considerable movement of extremely reactionary students springing up in many parts of the world including Great Britain. We are simply crazy if we think that this movement is not going to make real headway in our American colleges.

In 1935, General Secretary Jesse Wilson and Vice Chairman of the Administrative Committee C. Darby Fulton resigned, essentially because of the increasingly liberal drift of the Student Volunteer Movement. However, while the official stance of the Movement was becoming defined as liberal, particularly because of its cooperation with YMCA, the evidence also shows that a large portion of the Movement's student constituency continued to be of a rather more conservative cast. In 1928, Jesse Wilson had reported a revival of interest in missions on the campuses he had visited. The total number of outgoing missionaries for 1929 was a twenty-four percent increase over the total number sailing in 1928 and a forty-eight percent increase over the number sailing in 1927. In 1928, there were 252 new student volunteers, while in 1929 there were 609 new volunteers. Wilson thought that the SVM could survive and thrive by falling in with the growing conservative missions revival, but the majority of the Movement leadership was reluctant to see the Movement go in that direction. They were appalled by the fact that the Movement's membership was increasingly conservative. In 1936, reporting on a tour of American campuses, SVM secretary Wilmina Rowland wrote of the following conditions: "Some students confess that they have gotten wrong impressions of the missionary enterprise through the Student Volunteers on their campus, who in such cases enlist a pious group of the more dependent-minded students....In summary, it seems to me that the SVM across the country is quite definitely conservative."

Perusal of the correspondence between SVM headquarters and local Student Volunteer groups during this period confirms Rowland's analysis of the situation. While the Movement had once been a powerful force on prestigious campuses, the majority of Volunteer groups during the 1930s existed at small rural colleges and were propelled by local tradition rather than following closely the lead of the national Movement.

== Redefining the movement ==
The Student Volunteer Movement's financial situation had never been without problems, but in 1932, America's "religious Depression", combined with the nation's general economic condition, had led Jesse Wilson to admit that "because of financial conditions, we are so puzzled now about our whole program that it is difficult for us to commit ourselves to anything." The dire economic straits had not lessened by the end of the decade, and it became increasingly evident that the SVM had to regroup and Redefine itself or else cease to exist.

While the Student Volunteer Movement had fulfilled a clear and unchallenged role in its early years, as a student missionary education and recruitment agency, the need for such an agency was increasingly questioned in the between-War period. Wilmina Rowland reported in 1936:

The influence of the SVM across the country is not heartening. Many persons who believe strongly in missions feel that its days of usefulness are over. A number of foreign mission board secretaries say that if the Movement went out of existence, it would not affect their candidate work. Many, even among the conservative leaders, think that the Movement should revamp its functions and expand its membership if it is to continue its existence.

Statements of denominational missions leaders during this period confirm the conclusions of Rowland. In 1939, Methodist leader H.D. Bollinger wrote: "The SVM is a thing of the past and those who are charged with the responsibility of perpetuating it should realize this fact." At a meeting of denominational leaders in January 1940, it was suggested that since the SVM had done very little recruiting for the major boards in recent years, and did not seem likely to do more, the boards should set up their own cooperative recruiting system. The gauntlet was thrown out: "If the students want the SVM or its equivalent to continue, let them run it and finance it."

The Student Volunteer Movement entered these years of profound questioning without a stable leadership. In the decade following Jesse Wilson's resignation, four men served as acting or permanent General Secretary of the Movement. The General Council, an experiment in democracy begun after the Des Moines convention, was replaced by a smaller General Committee in 1936, which was in turn replaced by a different organizational arrangement in 1941. Amidst all this confusion, the Movement strove to identify the alternatives for its future existence. Most crucial during the late 1930s and the 1940s were the issues of how the Movement would relate to 1) the general student Christian movements (YMCA, YWCA, denominational student work and union movements), 2) conservative student Christian movements such as the InterVarsity Christian Fellowship, 3) the mainline denominational missionary programs, and 4) the evolving missions theory of the period.

== Comparison to other Christian student movements ==
The 1933 Commission on Student Volunteer Movement Policy, among other suggestions which were disturbing to the SVM leadership, had advocated the establishment of a Student Christian Movement in America which would unite YMCA, YWCA and SVM into one body. This idea was considerably ahead of its time in the United States, although an experimental body of this type had been established in Canada in 1988 and was already the mode of operation in Great Britain. There was, however, a growing conviction that the Volunteer Movement should cooperate very closely with the National Intercollegiate Christian Council (YMCA and YWCA), as well as with denominational bodies, while still maintaining its organizational autonomy.

At a consultation at Oberlin College in 1936, measures were taken to consolidate cooperation with the National Intercollegiate Christian Council, including the radical decree that individual SVM members and regional Student Volunteer groups should incorporate all their activities into the NICC work in their locality. In 1939, the National Intercollegiate Christian Council for the first time officially provided for the inclusion of the SVM General Secretary as a member of its Administrative Committee. Friendly relations were also established between the SVM and the University Christian Mission, a cooperative organization representing denominational student work. For a portion of 1938, SVM General Secretary Paul Braisted devoted three-quarters of his time to the Campus Secretaryship of the UCM.

A North American Student Conference on the World Mission of Christianity, sponsored by the NICC, the Council of Church Boards of Education, and the SVM, was held in Toronto in December 1939. At this conference it was voted to "recommend the continuance of the Student Volunteer Movement as the cooperative agency of the general Student Christian Movements for carrying forward their Christian World Mission emphasis in education and recruiting; and that, in addition, the Movement specialize in the following areas: 1) Establishment of standards of personnel for overseas service, and 2) Recruitment of personnel for missionary areas at home." The Student Volunteer Movement remained hesitant to sacrifice its autonomy at this phase of the development of student Christian work in the United States because it saw itself as a more ecumenical force than either the NICC or the denominational movements.

In 1944, the United Student Christian Council came into being as a national federation of YMCA, YWCA, and denominational student movements. The federation was ecumenical on the national level, but did not express itself ecumenically on the regional or local levels. Though remaining autonomous in policy, administration, and finance, the Student Volunteer Movement agreed to serve as the Missionary Committee of the United Student Christian Council. A dilemma remained for the SVM, however, because the USCC offered no regional ecumenical structures for the Movement to work through. The SVM's role in the USCC was restricted to the national level, to planning the quadrennial student mission conventions and producing educational material. Some itinerating work was possible in the sponsorship of special missions programs on campuses. From 1945 to 1947 the SVM sought to maintain contacts on the local level through a system of "campus representatives", but this system was not successful. In 1947 a Special Commission on the Future of the Student Volunteer Movement recommended that SVM campus missionary fellowship groups be reestablished. The new missionary fellowship groups were to be informal interest groups, however, rather than official organizations. The Movement had found that students interested in missions were calling for missionary fellowship groups because their special needs were not being met by the general student movements. The dangers of separatism, which had led to the elimination of local Volunteer Bands, seemed less alarming at this point than the dangers of the SVM program losing the support of its volunteers.

In 1953, the United Student Christian Council asked the Student Volunteer Movement to become its Missionary Department, as a step toward a fully ecumenical student movement in the United States. After due consideration, the Movement agreed to this next phase, and in 1954 became the Commission on World Mission of the USCC, "temporarily relinquishing its status as a member movement of the USCC." This was a functional relationship which still did not affect the financial and administrative autonomy of the Student Volunteer Movement. The theory of this relationship was acceptable to the SVM, but in practice certain difficulties emerged. At a SVM Policy Committee meeting in March 1956, it was a cause for concern that USCC member movements did not depend more on the SVM for missionary education. The Committee minutes indicate that both the Presbyterian and Methodist boards of foreign missions had active student departments of their own at this time.

In 1959, the United Student Christian Council, the Student Volunteer Movement, and the Interseminary Committee merged to form the National Student Christian Federation. The Student Volunteer Movement became the Commission on World Mission of the NSCF. Its tasks remained those of promoting missionary education, fellowship, and enlistment. It continued to plan and sponsor missions conferences, including the 19th Ecumenical Student Conference on the Christian World Mission held at Athens, Ohio in 1964 with 3000 students present. The National Student Christian Federation was reconstituted as the University Christian Movement in 1966. At this time, as the Concise Dictionary of the Christian World Mission phrases it, "the Commission on World Mission was among the first to act on the formation of a movement fully representative of the churches, and agreed that the sense of mission was sufficiently embodied in the student movement for the Commission to cease a separate existence."

== InterVarsity Christian Fellowship ==
The Student Volunteer Movement's decline, begun after World War I, reached its nadir in 1940. It was clear that if the Movement wanted to continue its existence it could not continue in its old role as a consensus movement acceptable to both conservatives and liberals. There was a parting of the ways, and the Movement had to choose to head in either a conservative or a liberal direction. As evidenced by the Movement's eventual entrance into the National Student Christian Federation, decisions made during this period had the effect of orienting the Movement in a more liberal direction. This orientation was not a foregone conclusion, however, for significant portions of the SVM's constituency and leadership were not in sympathy with the less evangelistic, more humanitarian drift of the "Y" and major denominational student movements during this period.

The SVM's path away from a more conservative basis can be traced in its relations with the InterVarsity Christian Fellowship, a student Christian movement established in the United States in 1940. The Volunteer Movement was initially very sympathetic to the aims of the Fellowship. In February 1944 SVM General Secretary Winburn Thomas wrote to a Yale Divinity School student: "I feel very keenly that we of the SVM have much to learn from the Inter-Varsity Fellowship, and I would therefore like to see represented on our Board of Directors the intensity of feeling and dynamic purpose which characterizes many of you in that movement."(SVM Archives, Series V, with Board of Directors records, February 1944) When the IVCF was discussed at a Movement meeting in October 1944 it was noted that the IVCF tended to attract "doctrinaire and controversial fundamentalists but "it was not yet clear that the Fellowship would be dominated by these types."

In 1948 it was reported to the SVM Board of Directors that many formerly strong student volunteer movements overseas had faded in importance, and missionary education tasks were often carried by InterVarsity Christian Fellowship groups in these countries. The report of the Special Commission on Future Policy at this time recommended that the new campus missionary fellowships being promoted by the SVM should strive to be on good relations with fundamentalist campus groups.

Although the Volunteer Movement continued to seek rapprochement with the IVCF, appointing fraternal delegates to its conferences and encouraging reciprocal action, the Fellowship's vigorous missionary program became a direct rival to the program of the SVM. It was the leadership of the IVCF, rather than its constituency, which was most inclined to discourage IVCF-SVM cooperation. In 1949 a SVM traveling secretary reported: "In one state school I found that the Inter-Varsity group themselves were not at all aware of the fact that the Fellowship officers on the national level do not wish to cooperate with the SVM. All the students were interested and would have been willing to sign SVM declaration cards, but they had their affiliations with Inter-Varsity and it did not seem wise to interfere...."

In the analysis of Vern Rossman, the Movement's fraternal delegate to the IVCF missions conference of 1951, there were four barriers to cooperation between the IVCF and the SVM: l)historical: the IVCF's reaction against the general student movements" humanitarian drift of the 1930s and its desire for institutional preservation; 2) psychological: the IVCF's taboos on smoking, dancing, and cosmetics, its particular forms of religious jargon, its inclination toward political and economic conservatism; 3) theological differences; and 4) the IVCF's lack of ecumenical spirit, "IVCF sees itself as exclusive in function ... doctrinally pure, true to the Bible ... emphasizing holiness almost to the exclusion of catholicity." Rossman reported that the IVCF conference program stressed Bible study and worship and although a few unofficial representatives of mainline denomination missions boards attended, the platform speakers generally represented conservative or faith missions boards.

Despite the barriers cited by Rossman, the SVM continued to make overtures to the IVCF. In September 1953 the SVM Board of Directors sent a letter to the Associate General Secretary of the IVCF asking for greater cooperation, "realizing that we are essentially one in purpose ... ." It was proposed that the Inter-Varsity Missionary Fellowship be represented on the SVM Quadrennial Planning Committee and on the Board of Directors. The Student Volunteer Movement became increasingly involved in the ecumenical student movement, effectively eliminating the possibility of IVCF cooperation, but it continued to admire the spirit of Fellowship in IVCF groups. At a Policy Committee meeting in 1956, the Committee members still hoped that "development of SVM Fellowship groups envisaged on campuses might bring SVM closer to IVCF in understanding."

== Denominational missions programs ==
While the Student Volunteer Movement was struggling to find its place in the shifting student Christian movement configuration it was also forced to reevaluate its relationship to the missions work of the major Protestant denominations. In its heyday the SVM had been viewed by the denominational boards as an invaluable tool for drumming up missions interest and providing a pool of recruits from which the boards could select their missionaries. The SVM's broad recruiting system did produce a considerable amount of "chaff" individuals who could not meet the boards' increasingly rigorous standards for trained and often specialized missionary personnel—but, in general, the boards were glad for the Movement's support and had often called upon its files to locate suitable candidates for specific openings overseas.

The era of disillusionment after World War I affected denominational missions activity fully as much as it did the Student Volunteer Movement. From the peak year in 1920 when 1731 new missionaries were sent overseas there was a steady decline in the numbers sent, reaching a low point of 550 in 1927 before rising again briefly. It was inevitable that the declining denominational activity would have a direct effect on the SVM's program. As E. Fay Campbell wrote to Jesse Wilson in 1935, "It seems harder than ever to get support, chiefly because of the continued financial state of the mission boards which does not permit them to send out many missionaries. It is almost impossible to get People to see the need for our Movement in the face of the fact that the boards are calling for so few new missionaries." As mentioned earlier, faith mission boards were experiencing growth during the period of decline of the more liberal denominational boards, but the Volunteer Movement had historically drawn most of its support from the major denominations, and its liberal stances increasingly divorced its program from the faith missions' developing work.

In the confusing days of the between-War period the SVM called upon board secretaries to help in evaluation of the Movement's role. Responses to a questionnaire sent out by the SVM's 1933 Commission on Policy indicated that some denominations continued to support the idea of a volunteer movement while others did not see a need for it. Representatives of the Baptist and Congregational boards expressed praise for the Movement while the Episcopal, Methodist and Presbyterian representatives were less enthusiastic. Criticism included the statements that "the Movement has dwindled until it is largely a movement of the 'hick' colleges" and "My fear is that at this present stage the idea of volunteering for foreign missions tends to divert the attention of Christian students from the essential obligation of the Christian, whether he goes to the field or stays at home." Before 1920, most denominations had not sponsored their own student fellowships and the SVM's role on campus had been clear. Partially in reaction to the liberal orientation of the "Y" movements, denominations developed their own campus student groups during the 1920s and 1930s. The effect of this trend was to obscure the SVM's role. According to a SVM report written in 1953, "In the late thirties, the pressure became so strong that SVM was forced to question its very existence, for many of those within the church student movement—which, by its very nature, was pushing SVM into a separatist movement—challenged the SVM and said that it should not operate as a separate movement."

The development of the Student Volunteer Movement's relationship with denominational campus ministries has been touched upon earlier, but here can be mentioned briefly the more direct channels of contact with denominational mission boards which the SVM maintained throughout its existence. When the National Council of Churches of Christ in the United States of America emerged in 1950, the SVM's role in the new organization was as a member Unit of its Division of Foreign Missions, Division of Home Missions and Joint Commission on Missionary Education. The NCCCUSA viewed the SVM as primarily an interdenominational recruiting agency to work among students. As the organization of the National Council of Churches evolved, the SVM became the Missionary Services Department of the Joint Department of Christian Vocation of the Division of Christian Education in 1951. In 1959 when the Volunteer Movement passed from autonomous existence, it was related to the National Council of Churches as the Department of Missionary Services of the Commission on Christian Higher Education.

== Missions theory ==
Various theories regarding missions activity have prevailed in American Protestantism during different historical periods. An early emphasis on evangelization for individual salvation gave way to concentration on church planting and educational work as bases for the spread of the Christian faith. With the rise of indigenous churches overseas the concept of ecumenical sharing gave continued justification for missionary activity. The Laymen's Commission of Appraisal in 1932 proposed a more radical conception of missionary work which involved not only inter-church development but also inter-faith development, drawing on increased appreciation for non-Christian religions. However, in Charles Forman's words, "the reaction of mission boards showed that the mission theory and theology of the Laymen's Commission was not that of American missions."

When missions activity was no longer viewed as an exporting of Christian civilization, but rather seen as a mode of worldwide ecumenical cooperation, the distinction between foreign missions and home missions became blurred. Throughout the post-World War I era, the Student Volunteer Movement constantly had to justify its continuing specific concentration on foreign missions. The "revolutionaries" of Des Moines in 1920 questioned the appropriateness of sending missionaries abroad when conditions in American were so much in need of Christianization. In a meeting in February 1920, the Standing Committee discussed at length the pros and cons of Student Volunteer Movement involvement in home missions work, but decided to continue the status quo focus on recruiting for foreign fields only. In 1922, a new home missions movement, the Student Fellowship for Christian Life Service, approached the SVM seeking cooperation; for over a year it used a room in the Movement offices as its headquarters.

It was not until 1945 that the Student Volunteer Movement went beyond cooperation with home missions programs to actual participation in recruiting and educational activity for home fields. It changed its name from the Student Volunteer Movement for Foreign Missions to the Student Volunteer Movement for Christian Missions. The announcement of this change noted that:

official action recognizes that the artificial separation of home and foreign missions is now passe', since the work of the Church, even as the world itself, is one. Whether the distinction between the pioneer, frontier worker on the one hand, and the supporting work on the other, can be or should be maintained for recruitment purposes remains to be seen. The declaration card of the Movement, which formerly had offered only one option, commitment to foreign missions, was revised to offer three alternatives:

- I. It is my purpose to become a Christian missionary ... at home or ... abroad.
- II. I propose to seek further guidance regarding the missionary vocation.
- III. I propose to support the world mission of the Church through my prayers, gifts and daily work.

This format for the declaration card came under attack from two different angles. Some thought that the Movement was making a mistake in relinquishing its specific focus on foreign missions education and recruitment. They thought that the Movement would become too diffuse and would lose any effectiveness which it still had. At the opposite end of the spectrum, others questioned the entire idea of a declaration card, wondering why the choice of a missionary vocation should be singled out for specific attention, since the Church's mission to the world could be carried out through nearly all vocations.

In 1949 a Committee to Study the Declaration Card was established and it proposed the following format for the card:

- ... It is my purpose to use my talents and resources to serve the Christian world mission, and in the light of its claims prayerfully to choose my life work.
- ... Further, it is my purpose, God willing, to be a Christian missionary ... at home ... abroad.

More than the phrasing of words on a 3" by 5" card was at-stake in discussion of the Student Volunteer Movement declaration of purpose. There was a question of missions theory—how was missionary activity to be distinguished from the normal interrelationships of Christian churches throughout the world? There was the related issue of the membership basis of the SVM—should it be restricted to individuals who had made a specifically missionary vocational commitment or should a wider base of students, those who were supportive of the Church's world mission, be considered members of the Movement? At a meeting in March 1952, Policy Committee members expressed divergent opinions. E. Fay Campbell felt that "The regular membership of the SVM should be made up of students ... who have purposed to offer themselves to Missions Boards for service." Vern Rossman called the first statement on the declaration card "highly problematic." "If we say that every Christian student should be centrally missionary, then every student 'should be' an SVMer." But, in another members opinion, "If one of the prime duties of the Christian community is to point out that almost all vocations can be 'Christian,' then surely the SVM is in a sense defeating the purpose of the Church by creating the feeling that service under a mission board is necessarily more important in the world mission than other vocations."

As the 1950s progressed and the Student Volunteer Movement became increasingly involved in ecumenical ventures it became clear that the Movement would have a distinct contribution to make to the student Christian scene only if it focused its concerns quite specifically on education and recruitment for world missions service under established mission boards and agencies. The distinction implied by this focus, between the Church's general mission in the world and its "missions", was not agreeable to all, but without such a distinction the need for a Student Volunteer type movement became much less apparent. Those striving to maintain the SVM's distinctiveness felt that the Movement still had a role to play in concentrating on the "frontiers" of the Church mission to the world. There were still many places around the world where strong indigenous churches had not been established and the SVM could help to provide Christian messengers to those areas. Furthermore' it was felt that even the stronger indigenous churches overseas would increasingly welcome the assistance of Western missionaries. As a missionary to China had written to John Mott, "Members of the younger Christian churches have actually taken over the responsibility for determining the future character of the Christian movement and, having worked at this job for a period of years, they now realized its complexity and the need for comradeship." Another "frontier" which the SVM Newsletter suggested for the Student Volunteer Movement's attention in 1957, was confrontation with atheistic communism.

In the years after the Student Volunteer Movement's merger into the National Student Christian Federation, a Committee for the Fellowship of Student Volunteers produced a monthly newsletter. A large proportion of the articles in these newsletters were related to missions theory, indicating the realization that until these questions of theory were resolved the role of student volunteers could not be clarified. In the May 1960 newsletter there was a call for an "adequate theology of mission". The problems were evident. "We used to feel that the Church has missions and thought of missions as something which was done for the other People at some distant place. Such an understanding was based on the assumption that Western Christians live in a Christian society and the Christian missionary task was to take our faith and culture to those areas where it was not known." The 1966 dissolution of the Student Volunteer Movement in its guise as the National Student Christian Federation's Commission on World Mission was the logical outcome of an increasingly prevalent theory of mission in liberal American Protestantism, one which stressed the worldwide ecumenical cooperation of the Church rather than focusing on frontier missions of the Western Church to the non-Western world.

== After World War II ==
As indicated by the foregoing, a considerable portion of the Student Volunteer Movement's energy in the era after World War II continued to be taken up in attempts to define its relationships to other student Christian movements and to general Protestant mission mechanics and theory. Despite the uncertainties involved in these evolving relationships, the Movement was able to bounce back from its 1940 nadir and to continue with a positive program for nearly two more decades.

Sydney Ahlstrom, among other historians of American religion, has described a post World War II revival in American Christianity which extended nearly to the end of the 1950s. Amidst social trends of urbanization and suburbanization, geographical mobility, and economic affluence, problems of adjustment and anxieties over status and 'acceptance' were ever-present. Churches were obviously the sort of family institution that the social situation required." . The Cold War atmosphere of the era was ripe for the resurgence of a religious faith which could promise peace of mind. Fundamentalist theology which had fallen into disrepute was revived in an intellectually updated form.

During the 1920s and 1930s Student Volunteer Movement leaders had frequently pointed out that the decline of the Movement was directly related to a decline in general interest in religion on American campuses. Students were not likely to commit themselves to missionary work when they were not wholly committed to the Christian faith. A resurgence of more evangelical religion during and after World War II allowed the SVM to find a broader base for its programs. The Board of Directors in 1944 concluded that "The Movement needs to make increasingly clear its commitment to a full evangelical missionary message and program ... Not alone in emphasis on current social improvement, but also in and through such service to a message that is in the fullest sense redemptive and eternal, will be its strength."

In 1946, the Student Volunteer Movement's listing of missionary openings, Christian Horizons, included nearly one thousand overseas vacancies. A publicity release for the Movement claimed that "faced today with the need for hundreds of new workers, both large and small boards look to the Student Volunteer Movement for assistance, both in supplying candidates to meet immediate needs, and in conducting a program of education and recruitment which will guarantee a steady stream of volunteers from which the boards can select personnel."

At a meeting of the SVM Board of Directors in April 1948, it was reported that the Movement's finances were in good condition and there were many evidences of increased missionary interest on the campuses. The Movement budget for 1951/1952 was $60,400, more than $10,000 above the budget of the previous year and six times the budget of 1941/1942. During the academic year 1952/1953 a travel staff of twenty men and women from five denominations visited over three hundred colleges in forty-four states on behalf of the Movement.

The resurgence sparked by increased religious interest and the nation's improving economic condition appears to have peaked for the SVM towards the middle of the 1950s, or at least to have taken a different form as the Movement was drawn into ecumenical ventures and faced with theoretical questions about its recruiting program. Twenty-one members of the Movement travel staff visited three hundred and fifty campuses during the academic year 1955/1956. At the same time, however, there were only five hundred declared student volunteers on American undergraduate campuses. The SVM budget for 1956/1957 was reduced to $50,000.

Programs of missionary education and support of student volunteers were carried on after the formation of the National Student Christian Federation by the Commission on World Mission and its Committee for the Fellowship of Student Volunteers. In May 1962 it was reported that the Committee's newsletter was sent to over three thousand volunteers or prospective volunteers. The Commissions program included staff visits to campuses, local Fellowship gatherings of volunteers, Week-End Conversations on Mission, personal encouragement and counseling, Frontier Seminars, the Quadrennial Conference, ecumenical summer service projects, and so forth.

== Leaders and participants ==
Partial list of those not mentioned in the article.

- William Scott Ament
- Walter Judd
- Kenneth Scott Latourette
- H. B. Sharman
- Charles Studd
- Frederick Howard Taylor
- Elwood G. Tewksbury
- Martin Farquhar Tupper

== See also ==
- Young People's Missionary Movement
