= Josh Wilder =

American playwright (born 1990)

- Born: 1990 (age 35–36); Philadelphia, Pennsylvania, U.S.A.
- Education: Carnegie Mellon University (BFA); Yale University (MFA)
- Occupation: Playwright

Josh Wilder (born 1990) is an American playwright whose work has been performed regionally across the United States and is best known for The Dandelion Plays, a work-in-progress play cycle inspired by Wilder’s experience growing up in inner city Philadelphia. His play, Leftovers, won The Great Plains Theatre Conference’s Holland New Voices Playwright Award in 2014. Wilder received a B.F.A. in acting from Carnegie Mellon and an M.F.A. in playwriting from the Yale School of Drama.

== Biography ==
Wilder grew up in South Philadelphia, raised by his single mother. At ten years old, Wilder won a lottery to attend the Philadelphia Performing Arts Charter School. After discovering August Wilson's play, Fences, Wilder wrote his first script when he was thirteen. Josh Wilder continued to study theatre at the Philadelphia High School for Creative and Performing Arts and went on to attend Carnegie Mellon for acting and playwriting at Yale. Playwright Quiara Alegría Hudes acted as a mentor for Wilder throughout high school and beyond, encouraging him to pursue the craft.

== Plays ==
=== She A Gem ===
The plot centers around Jaleesa, Krystin, and Ambera, double-dutch teammates who are preparing for a competition. The play was developed for The Kennedy Center's Theatre for Youth Audiences program and draws from Wilder's memories of block parties in Point Breeze growing up. Wilder uses the game of double-dutch as a symbol for resilience in a way that has implicit ties to African American pop culture.

=== Leftovers ===
Embracing magical-realism, Leftovers follows two teenage brothers, Jalil and Kwamaine, who are raised by a single mother, Raquelle, in South Philadelphia. The two aspire to break free of the poverty cycle. When a larger-than-life dandelion grows out of the ground, the brothers make wishes and reckon with the consequences of their ambitions. The young brothers dream of being as happy as the characters of The Cosby Show and look to the fictional T.V. character, Cliff Huxtable, as a surrogate father. Wilder weaves in the real-world social ramifications of Bill Cosby's sexual-abuse accusations and what the news meant for African Americans.

The play was workshopped at the O'Neill National Playwrights Conference in 2015 and was further developed at Boston's Company One Theatre’s C1 PlayLab, premiering in 2018 at The Strand Theatre.

In an interview with Portland Shakes, Josh Wilder revealed that as a Black adolescent growing up in his neighborhood, he saw first hand the conflict between the pursuit of following dreams and the limitations of the world around him. His personal experience and struggles of those in his neighborhood inspired him to write Leftovers.

- Salt Pepper Ketchup (2018)
- The Hands That Could (2018)
- The Highwaymen (2017)
- Wrong River (2017)

== Honors and awards ==
- Jerome Fellowship and Many Voices Fellowship recipient at The Playwrights’ Center.
- Holland New Voices Playwright Award from The Great Plains Theatre Conference.
- The Lorraine Hansberry Award.
- The Rosa Parks Award.
- ASCAP Cole Porter Prize.
- Residency at The Royal Court Theatre.
- Residency at Sundance at UCross.
