= Frances Farmer Wilder =

American radio executive

Frances Farmer Wilder was an American radio executive who was probably best known for her work with daytime programming on CBS.

== Early years ==
The daughter of Harry W. Farmer, Wilder was born in California. She was a graduate of San Bernardino High School and a 1921 graduate of the University of California. She also studied sociology at Columbia University and took courses at the University of Chicago. She learned Chinese and French while living in the Orient with her husband for seven years.

== Career ==
Before she worked in broadcasting, Wilder was society editor of the San Bernardino Evening Index. She later organized a courier service to help visitors to New York City, and in 1934 she created Rockefeller Guided Tours for Rockefeller Center. She moved to Hollywood in 1938 to become personnel director for CBS there.

In 1939, Wilder was named to the newly created position of educational director for the CBS Pacific Network with the responsibility of making the regional network's educational programming more effective. While she held that position, in 1941 she and a colleague began teaching classes in radio technique and writing at the University of Southern California.

During her six years in that position, Wilder created These Are Americans, a radio series "dedicated to bettering relationships of Mexican-Americans with their neighbors on our west coast." The program won the 1943 Peabody Award for Outstanding Community Service by a Regional Station for KNX, the originating station. A second series of These Are Americans in 1944 examined the situations of African-Americans on the West Coast and their contributions to agriculture, armed forces, arts, industry, and sciences. It was produced under the auspices of the Committee for Home Front Unity and Little Tokio Committee, Council of Social Agencies.

She also supervised What's it All About?, a program that sought to clarify issues in the news. Her work on that program was recognized when she was made a member of the Pacific Southwest Academy, the American Academy of Political & Social Science's Los Angeles affiliate. In 1943, scripts of Democracy's Workshop, which she originated, were given to the U. S. Office of Education for nationwide distribution.

As CBS's consultant for daytime programming, Wilder evaluated listeners' responses to programs and interpreted research. She was a liaison between the network's Program Department and advertising agencies and their clients, and she represented the network as a speaker before business, civic, educational, and social welfare groups. While doing so, she also sought those groups' input about daytime programming at CBS.

In 1947, Wilder was elected to a two-year term as president of the national Association of Women Broadcasters. She resigned her position at CBS later that year, and on September 1, 1947, she became director of the West Coast division of Social Research, Inc., a company that specialized in industrial and human relations. By late May 1949 she had become vice president and director of the company.
