= Kate Wilder =

US Army officer

Kate Wilder is a retired U.S. Army lieutenant colonel who became the first woman to complete the Army's Special Forces Officer Course in 1980. Although she was initially denied graduation, her official recognition followed a successful sex discrimination complaint and a subsequent Army investigation.

== Early life ==
A native of New Orleans and the daughter of a retired U.S. Army colonel, Wilder's motivation to enlist was shaped by personal and political events of the era. After her fiancé was drafted and killed in the Vietnam War in 1969, she became active in the Equal Rights Amendment movement during the 1970s. Prompted by a public challenge that supporters of equal rights should also accept equal responsibilities like the draft, Wilder and her sister decided to join the Army. Their father administered their oath of enlistment.

== Military career ==
Upon joining the Army, Wilder chose the military intelligence branch. She went on to graduate from the Airborne School at Fort Benning, reportedly becoming the first female officer to do so. As a jump-qualified intelligence officer, she was assigned to the 5th Special Forces Group at Fort Bragg in 1978 and also served as an adjutant for the John F. Kennedy Institute for Military Assistance. During this period, she examined military regulations and found no rule that explicitly restricted the Special Forces course to male soldiers.

=== Special Forces Qualification Course ===
Wilder's application to the Special Forces Officer Course was initially disapproved multiple times, but she persisted. She successfully appealed to a Pentagon office, arguing that the training was necessary for her role and that the combat-exclusion policy did not apply to a school environment. In the summer of 1980, at age 29, she entered the 13-week course at Fort Bragg.

During the course, Wilder faced significant opposition from instructors and the school's leadership. She stated that the physical standards were intensified specifically for her, including grueling rucksack runs in extreme heat. In one instance, an instructor dropped out of a run, but Wilder completed it. A 1981 report noted she never once fell out of physical training, which was not the case for all the male candidates who graduated.

Despite Wilder’s performance, the commander of the school informed her on the day before graduation that she had failed the final field exercise, known as "Robin Sage," and would therefore be dropped from the course. This contradicted what Wilder's own instructors had told her about her passing performance. The official reason given was for "caching equipment," a practice Wilder maintained was common among all students and not grounds for failure.

Consequently, Wilder filed a sex discrimination complaint. Her case prompted a four-month investigation led by Brigadier General F. Cecil Adams, which concluded that she had been wrongly denied graduation. On February 20, 1981, General Donn A. Starry, head of the U.S. Army Training and Doctrine Command, formally approved her appeal.

Wilder was awarded the "5 Golf" skill identifier for Special Forces and received a graduation certificate backdated to her original class date of August 21, 1980. The Army announced that as a qualified officer, she was entitled to wear the Green Beret if assigned to a Special Forces unit, though combat-exclusion laws at the time meant she would serve in a support capacity.

=== Later career ===
Although officially qualified, Wilder never returned to a Special Forces unit. After the course, she attended an advanced intelligence course in Arizona before being stationed in Germany. Following her graduation, the Army amended its regulations to formally bar women from the course, a policy that remained in effect until 2016. When the Special Forces tab was created in 1983, Wilder was deemed qualified and wore it for the remainder of her career. She later transferred to the U.S. Army Reserve, retiring in 2003 as a lieutenant colonel after 28 years of service.
