= David Wilder (activist) =

American leader of Israeli settlers

David Wilder is an American leader of Israeli settlers and was the spokesman for The Committee of The Jewish Community of Hebron.

== History ==
David Wilder was born in New Jersey in the United States in 1954, and graduated from Case Western Reserve University with a BA in History and teacher certification in 1976. He went to Israel in 1974 and studied in yeshiva for over eight years. He worked at Yeshiva Shavei Hebron (website here) in a public relations capacity. He has worked at Hebrew University and Yeshivat Mercaz HaRav. For the Israeli settlers of Hebron, he is the spokesperson for the community, in Israel and internationally.

David Wilder announced his resignation from the Hebron community organization, effective April 1, 2015. Presently he is Executive Director of Eretz.Org.

== Activism ==
David Wilder has spoken on behalf of the Israeli settlers of Hebron and has been an activist for their interest for 21 years. When the legality of the Beit HaShalom community's ownership of their living quarters was questioned, Wilder was active in speaking out on behalf of the community. When The Jerusalem Post talked with him, they wrote that he was certain that the community "had a strong claim to the structure."

An interview with David Wilder by an Egyptian-Belgian journalist was published in May 2012.

His op-ed piece concerning the expulsion from Beit HaShalom was published in The Jerusalem Post.

== Publications ==
David Wilder has published a number of Ebooks which can be found at his website. These include: Hebron Chronicles, Breaking the Lies, Sites in Hebron and more. He has also produced a number of apps for android which can be found here.

== Family ==
David Wilder is the son of the late Samuel and Pamela Wilder, and is married to Ora Wilder. They lived in the Israeli settlement Kiryat Arba for 17 years and as of 2013 have lived at Beit Hadassah for 17 years. They have seven children and many grandchildren.

== See also ==
- Yossi Dagan
