= Andrew Wilder (American football) =

American gridiron football player (born 1990)

Profile
- Position: Punter

Personal information
- Born: July 5, 1990 (age 36); Scottsdale, Arizona, U.S.
- Listed height: 6 ft 3 in (1.91 m)
- Listed weight: 220 lb (100 kg)

Career information
- High school: Notre Dame Prep (Scottsdale)
- College: Northern Arizona
- NFL draft: 2014: undrafted

Career history
- Tampa Bay Buccaneers (2015)*; Ottawa Redblacks (2015)
- * Offseason or practice squad member only

Andrew Wilder (born July 5, 1990) is a former gridiron football punter who played for the Ottawa Redblacks of the Canadian Football League (CFL) in 2015. He played college football at Northern Arizona.

== Professional career ==
=== Tampa Bay Buccaneers ===
Wilder was signed by the Tampa Bay Buccaneers on March 20, 2015.
