= Robert Wilder (environmentalist) =

American businessman (born 1960)

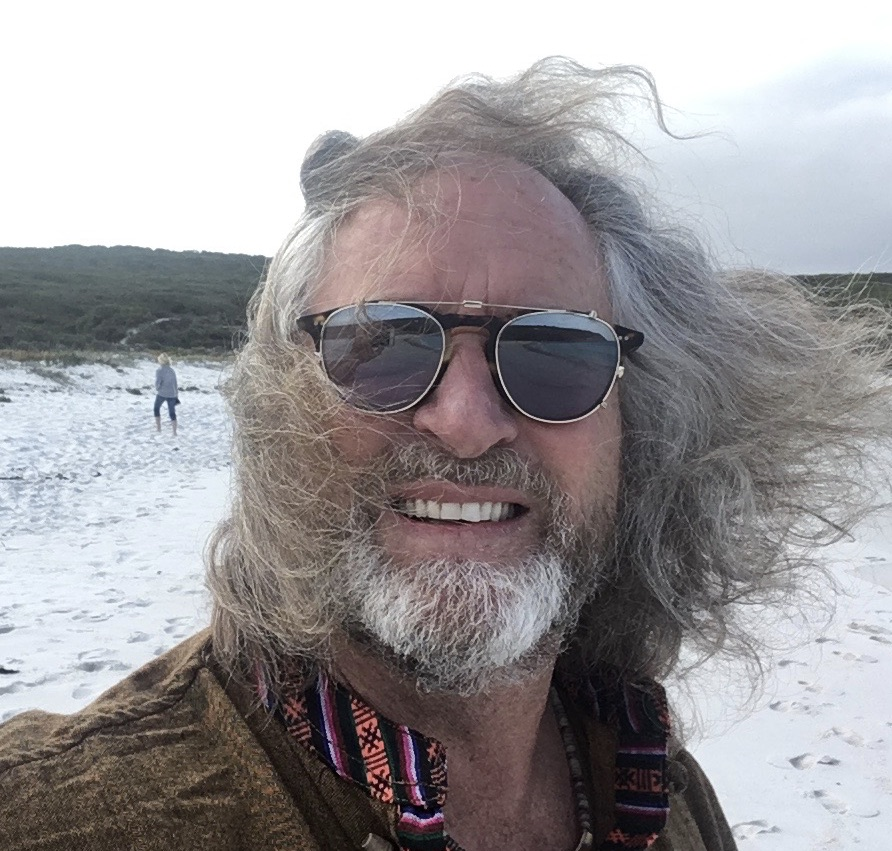
- Wilder in 2019
- Born: 1960 (age 65–66); Baltimore, Maryland, United States
- Education: Doctorate
- Occupations: Fund manager, academic
- Spouse: Diana (Francis) Wilder

Robert Wilder (born 1960) is an American businessman, environmental activist, and academic. Wilder is known for his environmental activism and lobbying, and his ability to combine capitalist ventures with environmentally friendly policies. Wilder is CEO & Founder of Wildershares, LLC; he is also the Manager of the WilderHill Clean Energy Index, which seeks to define and track the Clean Energy sector.

== Early life ==
Robert graduated with a Bachelor's degree in political science from the University of California, Santa Barbara in 1982, received his Juris Doctor from the University of San Diego in 1985, a master's degree from University of California, Santa Barbara in political science in 1988, and a Doctorate in political science from the University of California, Santa Barbara in 1991.

== Environmental protection activities ==
Wilder serves as the head or on the boards of numerous conservation organizations. Wilder served on the marine section of the Board of Governors of the Society for Conservation Biology, as the conservation director of the Pacific Whale Foundation in Honolulu and also runs the Hydrogen Fuel Cell Institute, a nonprofit that provides education and information about clean energy. Wilder is also part of a group of fishermen, native Hawaiians and environmentalists who formed the Coalition Against CO_{2} Dumping to protest the biggest ocean test planned off Hawaii's Kona coast. One of the group's complaints is that the test will not monitor the effect on sea life.

Wilder has been outspoken in criticizing policymakers for focusing conservation efforts to only species-level protection, instead of protecting at all three levels needed for biodiversity: diversity at the genetic, species and habitat levels. Wilder also levels that policymakers are only concerned with protecting the "large, awe-inspiring" animals such as whales, jaguars, or eagles, and ignoring other less-glamorous but still threatened species.

As a constant critic of overfishing, Wilder has drawn the ire of fishermen throughout his career. Wilder believes in greater restrictions to prevent overfishing, saying that overfishing has kept fish stocks from naturally replenishing themselves and has decreased the quantity and quality of stocks. Wilder claims that as of 1998, overfishing in United States water has cost an estimated $8 billion loss in annual revenues and lost 300,000 American jobs.

In order set an example for others and show that living environmentally friendly can be economically viable, Wilder has installed solar panels on the roof of his Encinitas, California home and publishes his energy consumption on his website for the world to monitor. Wilder claims the panels generate enough energy to keep his energy bill from the state power grid under $30. Wilder also drives an Australian Moke which he had a local engineering student convert to a hybrid, and an electric powered Tesla sports car.

== Capitalist enterprises ==
In 2004, Wilder created the WilderHill Clean Energy Index (ECO), which tracks solar, wind and other low-carbon energy technology companies. A year later, the mutual fund company Powershares Capital Management launched the WilderHill Clean Energy Portfolio exchange-traded fund (AMEX: PBW), which mirrors the performance of the ECO index. As of August 2008, PBW held about $1.4 billion in net assets. Wilder describes the philosophy behind quantifying funds by environmental, social and governance (ESG) issues: "This generation tends to be financially sophisticated as seen in the growth of low-cost, no-load funds. They now seek fund holdings that better reflect positives such as clean energy, organic foods and healthier living along with low expenses, transparency, less correlation to major indexes and better tax efficiency. And they shouldn't have to give up any performance in the aim of achieving good returns with social responsibility to boot."

The success of Wilder's index and fund has led other similar indexes to be launched. NASDAQ now has its Clean Edge U.S. Index and ETF, Dow Jones has its Sustainability Index, and Standard & Poor's this year launched green indexes of its own.

The PowerShares WilderHill Clean Energy fund was voted the best Exchange Traded Fund (ETF) on Wall Street for 2007 by Motley Fool and as the most innovative ETF for 2006 by Capital Link's "ETF Awards". Dr. Wilder was recognized by the San Diego Regional Energy Office with their "Outstanding Individual Achievement" for his clean energy work in 2006.

== Contributions to academia ==
Wilder is the author of Listening to the Sea: The Politics of Improving Environmental Protection,(University of Pittsburgh Press, 1998). He has taught at the University of Massachusetts Dartmouth, University of California, Santa Barbara, and presently teaches one class, "Environmental Marine Policy," at the University of California, San Diego.

Wilder has won a Fulbright fellowship, a 1989 California Sea Grant State Fellowship, an American Association for the Advancement of Science/United States Environmental Protection Agency Fellowship in Environmental Science & Technology, and is a two-time recipient of the National Academy of Sciences young investigator award.

== Politics ==
In 2004, Wilder ran for the Encinitas, California city council on the platform of better open space protection, improving traffic flow, and providing affordable housing. Wilder received 9 percent of the vote while the three incumbents were re-elected.
