= David Wilder (baseball) =

Minor-league baseball player and a former major-league baseball executive

David Scott Wilder (born October 14, 1960) is a former minor-league baseball player and a former major-league baseball executive.

== Early life and education ==
Wilder attended Berkeley High School in Berkeley, California and Contra Costa College. He earned a bachelor's degree in management from St. Mary's College of California, completing his degree while in the minor leagues.

== Baseball career ==
An outfielder, Wilder played minor-league baseball in the Oakland A's and Chicago Cubs farm systems, but never advanced to the major leagues. He hit .267 in six seasons in the minors. On April 3, 1987, the Chicago Cubs famously traded future Hall of Fame pitcher Dennis Eckersley and infielder Dan Rohn to the A's for Wilder and two other players. "Hey, I could have been traded for Joe Blow," Wilder told the San Francisco Chronicle in an article that was published on July 26, 2004. "It's part of baseball history." Wilder's playing career ended in 1988. After his career ended, he worked as a baseball coach for two years for the University of California.

== Career as a baseball executive ==
Wilder began his management career with Oakland in 1990, working as a scout and as a coach at Class A Medford in the Northwest League. He later joined the Atlanta Braves as a West Coast regional scouting supervisor, becoming a baseball operations assistant in September 1994. He was named an assistant scouting director for the Braves in August 1995, making him the highest-ranking African-American at that time in the Braves' organization, other than Hall of Famer Hank Aaron.

In January 1996, Wilder joined the Chicago Cubs organization, becoming director of minor-league operations, and rising to become assistant general manager. In September 1999, the Milwaukee Brewers hired Wilder as vice president for player personnel, and he became the team's assistant general manager in 2001. In 2000, Wilder was on the selection committee for the United States Olympic baseball team.

In 2004, Wilder joined the Chicago White Sox. He became director of player development during the team's World Series-winning season in 2005, and he was credited with being largely responsible for the team's acquisition of closer Bobby Jenks from the Los Angeles Angels of Anaheim.

In 2005, Wilder interviewed with the Boston Red Sox for the general manager's job that became available with the departure of Theo Epstein.

In February 2007, the White Sox promoted Wilder senior director of player personnel. He continued to oversee the team's Latin American operations, as he had while previously serving as director of player development.

== Scandal ==
On May 16, 2008, the White Sox fired Wilder and two scouts after an investigation in Latin America. Federal authorities were called in as well, and the baseball commissioner's office was investigating the parents of several Latin players about bonuses that they may have received from major-league baseball teams. A major league baseball investigator confirmed to the Chicago Tribune that the investigation involved skimming and was limited only to the White Sox.

On February 11, 2011, Wilder pleaded guilty to one count of mail fraud in federal court in Chicago. He was released on bond pending sentencing.

On August 28, 2013, U.S. district judge Charles Ronald Norgle, Sr. sentenced Wilder to two years in federal prison. He was ordered to begin serving his sentence on October 31, 2013. He was released from federal prison on October 9, 2015.
