= Robert Parmelee Wilder =

Religious missionary (1863–1938)

Robert Parmelee Wilder (August 2, 1863 – March 27, 1938) was a religious missionary born in Kolhapur, India who brought about the missionary awakening in the United States in 1886. He is best known for recruiting thousands of students to become missionaries through the Student Volunteer Movement for Foreign Missions he founded. He also led the YMCA in India for several years. He published several books documenting his work as a missionary.

== Early life ==
Robert Wilder’s parents, Royal Gould Wilder and Eliza Jane Smith, were missionaries who worked with the interdenominational American Board of Commissioners for Foreign Missions from 1846 to 1858 and independently from 1861 to 1870 before working with the Presbyterian Board of Foreign Missions from 1870 to 1875. Wilder was raised on an American Protestant mission in western India and committed himself to missionary service at the age of 10, believing "that there was nothing else to do, since the need abroad was greater than in America." His family moved to Princeton, New Jersey, in 1875, where his father, Royal Wilder, began publishing the Missionary Review, later known as the Missionary Review of the World.

== Education ==
Robert Wilder attended Princeton Preparatory School, Williston Seminary, and then enrolled in Princeton College in 1881. He was invited to an Inter-Seminary Missionary Alliance summer conference in 1883. Inspired by conservative Baptist holiness and mission advocate A. J. Gordon, Wilder organized a college foreign missionary society to encourage a religious revival among Princeton students. He left Princeton in 1884 because of poor health and spent three months working on a cattle ranch in Nebraska before returning to school and graduating in 1886. Wilder's best subjects were Greek and philosophy, and he had a gift for languages, speaking twelve fluently throughout his lifetime.

== Mission ==
=== Student Volunteer Movement ===
In 1886 Wilder attended evangelist Dwight L. Moody’s conference for college students at Mount Hermon, Massachusetts, where he convinced Moody to allow him to lead mission meetings and presentations. With the help of Arthur T. Pierson, a friend of Moody’s, Wilder persuaded 100 students to commit to becoming foreign missionaries. They became known as the “Mount Hermon Hundred” and later, as more members joined, became the Student Volunteer Movement for Foreign Missions (SVM) in 1888. Wilder continued his recruitment work, and from 1886 to 1887, he reached out to students at over 162 educational institutions, recruiting 2,000 students to become foreign missionaries, including 250 women.

=== Great Britain ===
Wilder attended the Union Theological Seminary in New York City from 1887 to 1891; however, he never sought ordination. In 1891, he left for Great Britain to continue recruiting students at British universities.

Wilder briefly went to Norway to recover health in 1891 where he met and later married(1892) Helene Olsson of Gjovik. They had four daughters.

After working in India for 13 years, Wilder returned to Britain in 1905. Starting in 1905, Wilder spent eleven years working with the SVMU and the British Student Christian Movement.

=== India ===
Wilder sailed to India 1892, where he worked with the Calcutta Young Men’s Christian Association (YMCA) from 1893 to 1894 and with Hindus in western India from 1895 to 1897. He spent the following two years working in the United States for the YMCA and SVM before returning to India in 1899. There, he was the college secretary for the YMCA international committee and later the national secretary for the YMCA of India. He had to resign in 1903 due to poor health.

=== Norway ===
Wilder frequently went to Norway for his health. This included a trip while he was in Britain in 1891. He also recovered there when he returned from India from 1903–1905.

In 1915, World War I forced Wilder and his family to leave for Norway before heading to the United States in 1916. For the next three years, he served as the secretary for the YMCA’s religious work department and, once the U.S. entered the war, directed the Religious Work Bureau of the YMCA’s War Work Council.

== Publications ==
- Pledge of the Student Volunteer Movement for Foreign Missions United States, 1890.
- The Bible and Foreign Missions. United Kingdom: S.V.M.U, 1897.
- Christian Service Among Educated Bengalese: Printed for Private Circulation. India: Civil and Military Gazette Press, 1895.
- Studies on the Holy Spirit Based Upon the Acts of the Apostles: For Bible Circles and Private Study. United Kingdom: Student Christian Movement, 1914.
- The Great Commission: The Missionary Response of the Student Volunteer Movements in North America and Europe : Some Personal Reminiscences. United Kingdom: Oliphants, 1936.

== Sources ==
- Kelleher, Matthew Hugh (1974). Robert Wilder and the American foreign missionary movement (Thesis). OCLC 8934120. ProQuest 302765240.
