= Terri L. Wilder =

American social worker and activist

Terri L. Wilder is an American social worker and AIDS activist. She is a lecturer at the Columbia University School of Social Work as well as adjunct faculty at the Fordham Graduate School of Social Service, writer (TheBody/TheBodyPro since 2007) and HIV Activist. Wilder is a social worker and an advocate for people with HIV/AIDS, people with Myalgic Encephalomyelitis, also known as Chronic fatigue syndrome (with which she has been diagnosed) and people in the LGBT community.

== Education ==
In 1992, Wilder earned a MSW from the University of Georgia School of Social Work after earning a Bachelor of Social Work in 1989 from the University of Georgia.

== Career ==
In 1989, Wilder began working with the LGBT community and people with HIV/AIDS. Wilder provided HIV Social Services as well as coordinating education for both clients and service providers, speaking at many conferences around the world on behalf of policy change. Wilder has also served as director of HIV/AIDS Education and Training at the Spencer Cox Center for Health in New York City. The Cox Center is part of the Institute for Advanced Medicine (IAM) which along with the Mount Sinai Health System received a multi-year, multi-million dollar clinical education training grant from The New York State Department of Health, AIDS Institute. Wilder was the grant’s director to train health care providers who work with people with HIV, Hepatitis C and Sexually Transmitted Diseases in ways to improve their outcomes.

=== HIV/AIDS activism ===
Wilder moved to New York City in 2009 from Georgia (U.S. state) and by July 2013, her frustration with the care and prevention system in place for HIV had led her to join ACT UP/New York. Joining ACT UP New York’s Prevention of HIV Action Group (PHAG), inspired her to become more active.

Wilder has served on the New York Governor’s Task Force to End AIDS (EtE) as well as the Hepatitis C Elimination Task Force. She serves on the New York State Department of Health AIDS Advisory Council EtE Subcommittee.

== Selected publications ==
- For the Love of Friends’ Documentary: How an AIDS Activist Ran Over 9,000 Miles to Raise Awareness
- Women of ACT UP/NY Fight Back! Fight AIDS!
- Challenging Health Providers to Challenge HIV Stigma: ‘It’s Important That Not Every Visit Be Totally Focused on Just HIV’
- Contributor to The Long COVID Survival Guide: How to Take Care of Yourself and What Comes Next—Stories and Advice from Twenty Long-Haulers and Experts
- Family Doctor: ME/CFS What Every Family Physician Needs to Know
